= Union College, University of Queensland =

Union College
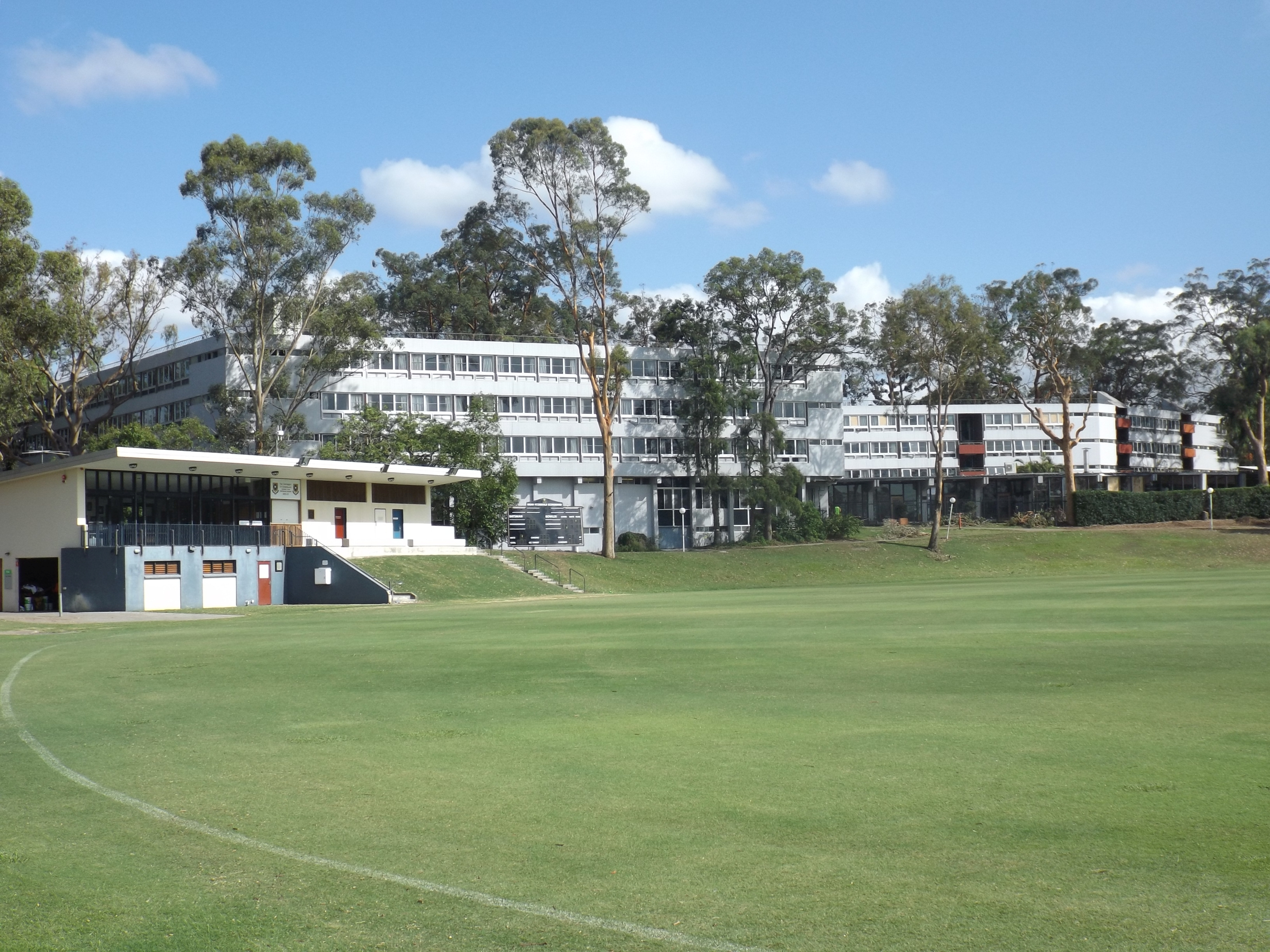
- Union College building and Oval 1 WEP Harris Oval

- Location within Queensland Location within Australia
- 27.5005°S 153.011°E
- Location: University of Queensland, 38 Upland Road, St Lucia, Queensland, Australia

History
- Design period: 1940s–1960s (post-World War II)
- Built: 1964–1974

Site notes
- Architect: James Birrell
- Architectural style: Brutalism

Queensland Heritage Register
- Official name: Union College
- Type: state heritage (built, landscape)
- Designated: 6 December 2004
- Reference no.: 602504
- Significant period: 1960s (historical); 1960s–1970s (fabric); 1965–ongoing (social)
- Significant components: college – residential, trees/plantings, courtyard

Union College is a heritage-listed residential college at University of Queensland, 38 Upland Road, St Lucia, Queensland, Australia. It was designed by James Birrell and built from 1964 to 1974. It was added to the Queensland Heritage Register on 6 December 2004.

== History ==
The Union College building at the University of Queensland campus was built in five major stages between 1964 and 1972 to the design of James Birrell, Staff Architect for the university between 1961 and 1966.

Proposals for a Queensland university were first made in the 1870s, but the idea did not have strong public or government support in a new colony where tertiary education was not a funding priority. An Act of State Parliament eventually established the new University of Queensland on 10 December 1909. Sir William MacGregor, the incoming Governor of Queensland, was appointed as the first Chancellor. Before his arrival, it had been decided to purchase and renovate "Fernberg", a house at Bardon, as the new Government House and to use the vacated government residence and part of its grounds at Gardens Point for the university. This was a controversial decision and many thought that the building and domain were unsuitable and too small for the purpose. There was little room for expansion and there were conflicts with the neighbouring Brisbane Central Technical College. In 1910 the first teaching faculties were created and in early 1911 the first students enrolled, although relocation was already being discussed.

Victoria Park had been chosen in 1906 as a campus site, though the high cost of preparing the steeply sloping land for building presented problems and Yeronga Park and St Lucia were also considered as options. In 1926 the difficulty of obtaining a suitable permanent site was solved when Dr James Mayne and Miss Mary Mayne made £50,000 available to the Brisbane City Council to resume land at St Lucia and present it to the university. In 1930 the University Senate handed over Victoria Park, less eleven acres reserved for a medical school, to the Brisbane City Council in exchange for the St Lucia site.

During the years of the Depression that followed, government funding and staff numbers were reduced, although student enrolments trebled between 1923 and 1933. There was no prospect of building on the new site until 1935 when the Premier, William Forgan Smith, announced that the Queensland Government would undertake construction. The University Senate committee produced a preliminary design and the Sydney firm of Hennessy, Hennessy & Co was appointed as architects for the project. They produced the Great Court plan with its sandstone, classically inspired buildings that remains central to the university and which influenced later building.

The foundation stone was laid in 1937 but the Second World War disrupted work and the main building was used as the headquarters of General Sir Thomas Blamey, head of the Australian Defence forces. Work had re-commenced by 1948 and the Forgan Smith Building was officially opened in May 1949 followed by other major buildings of the Great Court in the 1950s and 60s.

Residential Colleges to accommodate the students had been established for some time on the edges of the inner city area but it was intended that they should relocate when permanent sites were available on the new campus. Sites had been allocated for Emmanuel, St John's, King's, St Leo's, Duchesne and Women's Colleges, although the war had halted construction plans, as it had the development of the university buildings. Religious institutions ran all but Women's College and all accommodated only a single gender.

In 1943 the University of Queensland Students' Union planned a non-denominational Union College as an alternative to traditional religious colleges. It was expected that after the war student numbers would increase greatly and that accommodation would be in short supply. A Student Housing Committee was formed. It was intended that the new college should be owned by the Union, run by a Warden elected by the students and approved by the university Senate, and governed by a representative body of students. However, land had only been allocated at St Lucia for the six colleges existing when plans were drawn up in the 1930s. High building costs also delayed the construction of a new building and the Union opened a student hostel in rented premises in Wickham Terrace in 1947. By 1950 the hostel had gained College status and in 1952, the Union requested that land be allocated for the college on the St Lucia campus. Land opposite the St John's College site and bordered by the no 1 oval and a grove of native trees was reserved for Union College in December 1952. Building schemes were considered in 1953, but the cost was too great and the Union purchased two large houses in Wickham Terrace in April 1956, after the premises they had formerly rented was sold.

In January 1958, a sub committee was set up to consider building schemes, though these could not be implemented until the 1963–66 triennium. The buildings at Wickham Terrace had proved to be a good investment and the loan was paid out by 1960. It was decided to survey the St Lucia site, though the university's Staff Architect, James Birrell, questioned its suitability. He suggested that "if the Union College were built along the west frontage of the Tree Reserve in buildings artfully arranged to avoid destruction of trees, it would be on elevated ground, not overlooked by surrounding country, associated only with residential development and on good foundation." This new site was approved and transferred to the college in December and Birrell began preparation of plans for the college.

James Peter Birrell was born in Melbourne and studied architecture at Melbourne Technical College. Following World War Two he worked as a draughtsman for the State, then the Commonwealth Works Departments. As a cadet architect with the Commonwealth Department of Works he was accepted as a fourth year student at the University of Melbourne. After graduating in 1951 he graduated and worked briefly as Resident Architect at the Commonwealth Serum Laboratories. In 1952 he co-founded Architecture and Arts with Peter Burns, Helen O'Donnell and Norman Lehey. Transferred to Canberra, he worked on the design of schools, telephone exchanges, group housing, and alterations to the Canberra Repertory Theatre. Moving back to Melbourne in 1953, he worked on post office buildings. Birrell exhibited with the Contemporary Art Society and helped to organise a tour for them before being transferred to Darwin to take charge of the Commonwealth Department drawing office. Here he designed schools, hospital extensions, shopping centres and various ancillary structures.

In 1955 he resigned from the Commonwealth Works Department and was appointed Architect in Charge of the drawing office of the Brisbane City Council's Architectural Branch. While with the council, he designed a large number of public buildings, many of which were illustrated in national design journals, and included such innovative buildings as the former Toowong Municipal Library Building, the Centenary Pool Complex and the Wickham Terrace Carpark.

Birrell was Architect to the University of Queensland from 1961 to 1966, overseeing the university's second major phase of construction development. Beginning part-time lecturing at the university's Department of Architecture and at Queensland Institute of Technology, he also worked on the Master Plan for the expansion of the university. His most notable buildings designed in this period include Union College, the JD Story Administration Building, Staff House and the Agriculture and Entomology Building (now the Hartley Teakle Building). As part of his work for the university, he designed the James Cook University in Townsville in 1963, and continued to design buildings for the St Lucia campus. In 1965 Birrell was appointed President of the Australian Planning Institute. In 1966 he designed the Union Theatre and Hartley Teakle Building before moving into private practice.

By July 1963, Birrell had developed a plan for Union College that he believed would provide a residential collegiate atmosphere without undue institutional appearance. This has been achieved by meandering the dormitory block in a more or less rambling fashion so that it encloses in effect two cloistered courtyards, one of which overlooks no 2 oval across the top of the communal facilities building and the other, the residential section of Upland Road. Incidentally, this meandering avoids the removal of any substantial trees.

The facilities block has been arranged along even contours one floor lower than the dormitory building so that at no point are the bedroom outlooks detrimentally affected. Service entrance is at the north so that service facilities are grouped against the future substation area that adjoins the sites, hence buffering incompatible areas from the college. The facilities block requires the removal of two trees only.

This plan represented the cutting edge of international ideas on architecture in respect of its form and the mode of its construction and generated a considerable amount of interest in the building and design industries. It achieved a combination of good quality design and economy while responding imaginatively to its site. In an era when buildings in Queensland were generally constructed on a cleared and levelled site, not only the placement, but also the design of the college buildings was influenced by the existing topography and vegetation, which became part of the design. Union College would affect the funding of college buildings throughout Australia. The tender of T J Watkins was accepted in June 1964 and the first stage was still being completed when Education Minister, Jack Pizzey, officially opened it in July 1965. The first stage comprised part of the Common Facilities wing residential blocks and staff quarters at a cost of £240,000 ($480,000). The new college was adjudged one of the ten best buildings in Australia for 1965 by the Australian Journal of Architecture and Arts.

Union College marked a departure from the design of other residential colleges on campus. Innovative features ranged from the large one piece pivoting windows to the flat roof intended to be used for living and recreational space. Forms were simple and robust and the stone, timber, off form concrete and metals chosen were intended to weather to soft tones of grey with contrasts in texture.

The college was not only innovative in its form and use of materials and in its response to the site, but also in concept. Previous designs for student accommodation in Queensland were more conservative and had followed traditional institutional models. Union College had courtyards, recreational and tutorial facilities and student units, providing a modern lifestyle for adult students. As an extension of this approach, in 1968 Union College became the first coeducational residential college in Queensland (in 1967 University Hall at the Townsville University College opened for student accommodation as a coeducational residential college John Lee – President University Hall Students Association 1968). Although this was a controversial move in the conservative atmosphere of the time, this and other features of life at Union College, innovative in the 1960s and 70s, are now the norm as university accommodation more closely reflects daily life in the wider community.

Extensions were carried out during the 1963–66 triennium including extending the facilities wing, landscaping and constructing the warden's residence on the ground floor of block F. The tender of C P Hornick and Sons was accepted in May 1966 for an overall cost of $77,463.

The next stage comprised construction of Block C (floors GHJ and KLM). The tender of Harris James was accepted in July 1967 and the work was completed in June 1968 at a cost of $412,815. Half of the rooms in this residential block were made available to women students, though they were at first accommodated on different floors to the men.

In June 1968 the Brisbane City Council purchased the two old college buildings in Wickham Terrace at a cost of $265,000. Planning for the 4th stage of construction began in 1969. This was to complete the residential wings and build units for married tutors and tutorial rooms. Federal funding of $150,000 was granted for this stage (PQR floors) and the tender of C P Hornick was accepted in December 1969. The completed cost was $397,344.

Plans were then begun for the completion of the college (XYZ floors). Harris James tender was accepted in January 1973 and work was finalized in 1974. The college as a whole was estimated to have cost $1,500,000 to build.

In the late 1990s a detached brick function room with a tiled, hipped roof was constructed to the rear of the kitchen. It was also designed by Birrell, but does not match the earlier buildings in form or materials.

Some changes have taken place, though the buildings are substantially intact and retain their character. The off-form concrete has been painted with sealant. Trios of hopper windows have replaced the majority of the large pivoted windowpanes that formed a distinctive feature of the design. An unsympathetic security fence has been added at the south.

The landmark trees, which were an important part of the original design concept, remain though secondary planting of has been added.

== Description ==
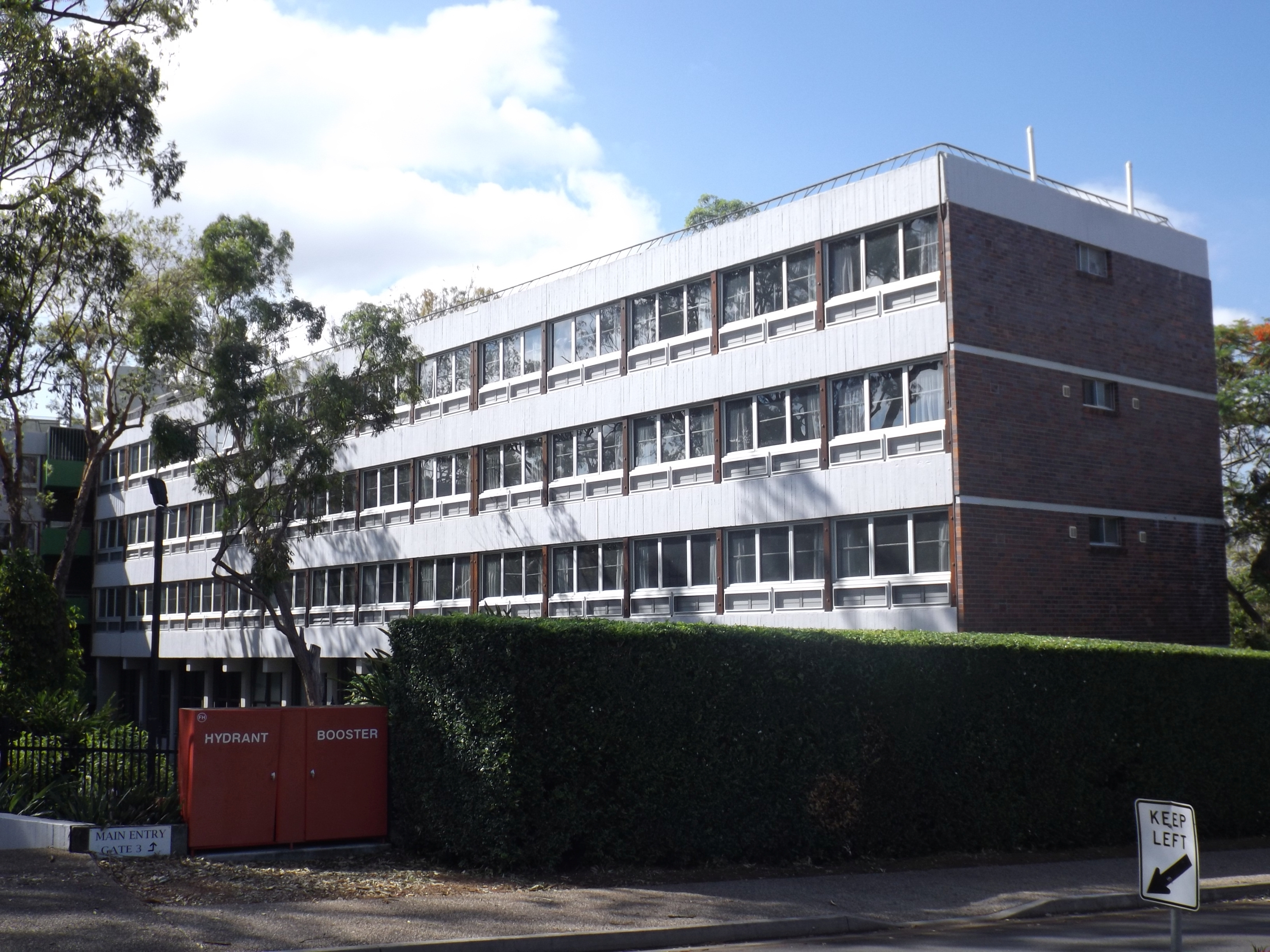
Western Wing, 2014

The University of Queensland is located on a large allotment on a bend of the Brisbane River at St Lucia. The Great Court is sited to dominate the rise of the land and have a commanding view of the surrounding campus buildings, the playing fields and the river beyond. The residential colleges are grouped to the south along the river with Union College set slightly further back.

Union College comprises several buildings. The two main buildings are linear in form and have an extruded appearance. The facilities block is a single-storey building facing north-east, which flows through underneath the lower storey of the residential block. The structure has a steel sheeted roof supported by an off-form concrete portal frame infilled with Mt Coot-tha bluestone. This type of structure creates a large open-plan internal space. The floors are parquetry, the ceilings are lined with strawboard and the joinery is blackbean. There is a distinctive brick fireplace with four arched openings over a central hearth.

There are courtyards formed between the angles of the buildings. Raised areas set with trees and surrounded by bluestone retaining walls preserve original hillocks on the site. The existing major trees have been supplemented by plantings of other trees, shrubs and flowering plants

The residential block is a three-storey building supported on off-form concrete pilotis. Sections of it are infilled below as the ground level drops away, but the three storey residential section is constant. The plan form of the building follows different angles, facing variously north-east, east, and north, creating courtyards that contain large mature trees and gardens. The pilotis support dark manganese brick internal walls. Open stairwells with off-form concrete external balustrades are located at regular intervals along the building. The external areas of off-form concrete have been painted. Windows are metal framed, with the original windows composed of a large panel spanning the window space at the top with two smaller windows below. All are pivoted horizontally and double-glazed with Venetian blinds enclosed. Most of the upper panels of the original windows have been replaced with triple hopper windows. The roof is reinforced concrete, and ceilings are sprayed vermiculite.

The former staff house lies between the accommodation and facilities blocks and echoes the form and materials of the accommodation blocks. It is .is a two-storey building constructed of brick and off form concrete with steel framed windows.

== Heritage listing ==
Union College was listed on the Queensland Heritage Register on 6 December 2004 having satisfied the following criteria.

The place is important in demonstrating the evolution or pattern of Queensland's history.

Union College marks an important stage in the modern development of the University of Queensland. An innovative residential college designed in 1963, it was modern and functional in concept and construction and responds to the vegetation and topography of its site. It marked a departure from college design on this campus and reflected international ideas on architecture.

The place is important because of its aesthetic significance.

Union College was highly praised at the time of its building as visually pleasing, well conceived and innovative structure.

The place is important in demonstrating a high degree of creative or technical achievement at a particular period.

Union College was highly praised at the time of its building as visually pleasing, well conceived and innovative structure. The design was innovative in its interaction with the site, in its form and use of materials and represented a high degree of creative achievement, recognised by a High Commendation award by Arts and Architecture journal as one of the best ten new buildings in Australia at the time.

The place has a strong or special association with a particular community or cultural group for social, cultural or spiritual reasons.

Union College has social significance as an important component of university life to the many people who have resided there as students or as teachers and administrators. It also represented a departure from tradition in the provision of a modern lifestyle for students and as the first residential college in Queensland to offer accommodation to both men and women.

The place has a special association with the life or work of a particular person, group or organisation of importance in Queensland's history.

Union College is important as a major work of James Birrell, an architect of national stature and repute, and is evidence of his thought and practice. Birrell was Staff Architect for the University of Queensland when he selected the site and designed Union College and was involved with the master planning of the campus. He had a design philosophy that integrated structures and landscape as evidenced by this building. The work of James Birrell, particularly for the Brisbane City Council and the University of Queensland is widely held to be influential and innovative.
