= Great Court, University of Queensland =

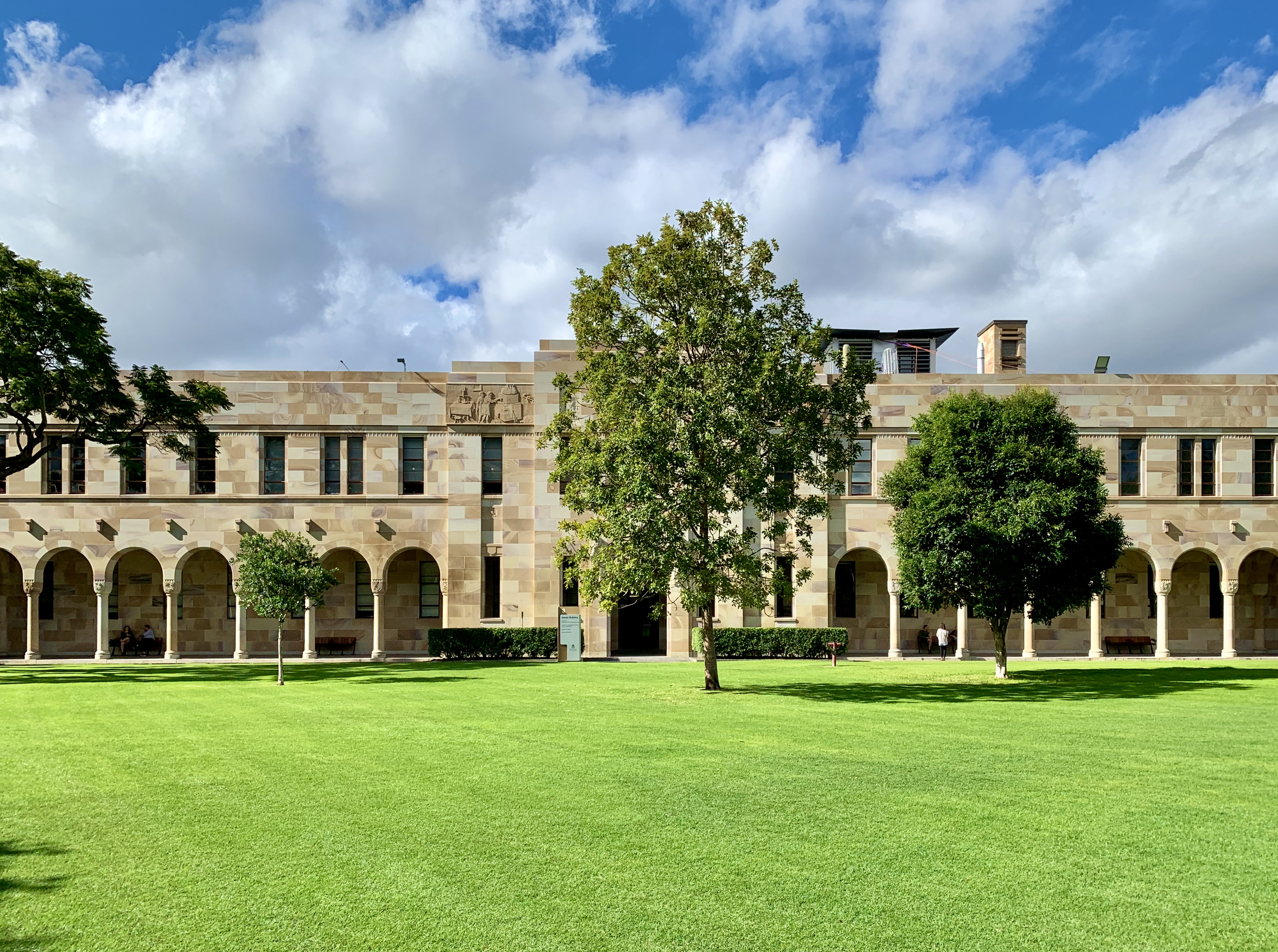
- The Great Court, The University of Queensland
- Interactive map of Great Court, University of Queensland
- 27.4968°S 153.0133°E
- Location: University of Queensland, St Lucia, City of Brisbane, Queensland, Australia

History
- Design period: 1919–1930s (interwar period)
- Built: 1937–1979
- Built for: University of Queensland

Site notes
- Architect: John Francis (Jack) Hennessy
- Owner: University of Queensland

Queensland Heritage Register
- Official name: University of Queensland, Great Court Complex
- Type: state heritage (built, landscape)
- Designated: 8 March 2002
- Reference no.: 601025
- Significant period: 1920s–1940s (historical); 1930s–1970s (fabric); 1930s–ongoing (social)
- Significant components: decorative features, tower, library – building, cloister/s, decorative finishes, classroom/classroom block/teaching area

Great Court is a large, heritage-listed area surrounded by five university buildings linked by an internal colonnade at the University of Queensland, St Lucia, Brisbane, Queensland, Australia. It was designed by John (Jack) Hennessy and built from 1937 to 1979. It was added to the Queensland Heritage Register on 8 March 2002.

== History ==
Proposals for a university in Queensland began in the 1870s. A Royal Commission in 1874, chaired by Sir Charles Lilley, recommended the immediate establishment of a university. Those against a university argued that technical rather than academic education was more important in an economy dominated by primary industry. Those in favour of the university, in the face of this opposition, distanced themselves from Oxford and Cambridge and proposed instead a model derived from the mid-western states of the US. A second Royal Commission in 1891 recommended the inclusion of five faculties in a new university; Arts, Law, Medicine, Science and Applied Science. Education generally was given a low priority in Queensland's budgets, and in a colony with a literacy rate of 57% in 1861, primary education was the first concern well ahead of secondary and technical education. The government, despite the findings of the Royal Commissions, was unwilling to commit funds to the establishment of a university.

In 1893, the Queensland University Extension Movement was begun by a group of private individuals who organised public lecture courses in adult education, hoping to excite wider community support for a university in Queensland. In 1894, 245 students were enrolled in the extension classes and the lectures were described as practical and useful. In 1906 the University Extension Movement staged the University Congress, a forum for interested delegates to promote the idea of a university. Opinion was mobilised, a fund was started and a draft Bill for a Queensland University was prepared. Stress was laid on the practical aspects of university education and its importance for the commerce of Queensland. The proceedings of the Congress were forwarded to Queensland Premier William Kidston. In October 1906, sixty acres in Victoria Park were gazetted for university purposes.

The University of Queensland was established by an Act of State Parliament on 10 December 1909 to commemorate the 50th anniversary of Queensland's separation from the colony of New South Wales. The Act allowed for the university to be governed by a senate of 20 men and Sir William MacGregor, the incoming Governor, was appointed the first chancellor with Reginald Heber Roe as the vice chancellor. Government House (now Old Government House) in George Street was set aside for the University following the departure of the Governor to the Bardon residence Fernberg, sparking the first debates about the best location for the university.

In 1910, the first teaching faculties were created. These included Engineering, Classics, Mathematics and Chemistry. In December of the same year, the Senate appointed the first four professors; Bertram Dillon Steele in chemistry, John Lundie Michie in classics, Henry James Priestley in mathematics and Alexander James Gibson in engineering. In 1911 the first students enrolled.

Practically from the start there was controversy about a permanent site for the University. Old Government House was too small and was seen by many as evidence merely of government parsimony. There was not much room for expansion and there were conflicts with the neighbouring Brisbane Central Technical College. Victoria Park had been chosen in 1906 for a permanent site and in 1922 a further 170 acres (69 ha) were vested in the University. The high cost of preparing the steeply sloping land at Victoria Park for building made it a less than ideal site despite its central location and proximity to the Royal Brisbane Hospital. Yeronga Park and St Lucia were considered as options. But in 1926 the whole issue was transformed when Dr James O'Neil Mayne and Miss Mary Emelia Mayne made £50,000 available to the Brisbane City Council to resume land at St Lucia and present it to the University. Opinion was divided with Professor Steele and many members of the medical profession against St Lucia because of its isolation and lack of public transport. A meeting of the Senate, on 10 December, voted for the St Lucia site on the condition that the city council provided access. Those voting for St Lucia included Archbishop James Duhig, Edwin James Droughton Stanley, Alexander Melbourne and Professor Henry Caselli Richards. Dr Lockhart Gibson, Chancellor Andrew Joseph Thynne and Archbishop Gerald Sharp were amongst those who voted for Victoria Park. In 1930 the Senate handed over Victoria Park, less eleven acres reserved for a medical school, to the Brisbane City Council in exchange for the St Lucia site.

During the years of the Depression that followed the university suffered progressive reduction of government funding. Cuts were made to both staff salaries and numbers while student numbers trebled between 1923 and 1933. There was no prospect of building the new university until 1935 when the Premier, William Forgan Smith, announced that the Queensland Government would undertake construction at St Lucia. This was one of the three major development projects initiated in the mid 1930s by the Queensland Government to create employment, the others being the Somerset Dam on the Stanley River and the Story Bridge. The University Senate called for and received schemes from various enthusiasts, including Professor Roger Hawken, Dr Frederick Walter Robinson, Andrew Baxter Leven and Dr John Bradfield. Taking ideas from these suggestions the Senate committee produced its own preliminary design. The principal building, containing Arts, Law and administration, was E-shaped and enclosed one side of an arcaded quadrangle. Related outer buildings contained Engineering, Biology, Medicine, Physics, Chemistry, Geology, a museum and a teachers' training college. The Queensland Government, despite hopes for a competition, appointed the Sydney firm of Hennessy, Hennessy & Co as architects for the project, principal architect John (Jack) Hennessy (1887–1955) produced the coherent and logical plan that still lies at the heart of the University.

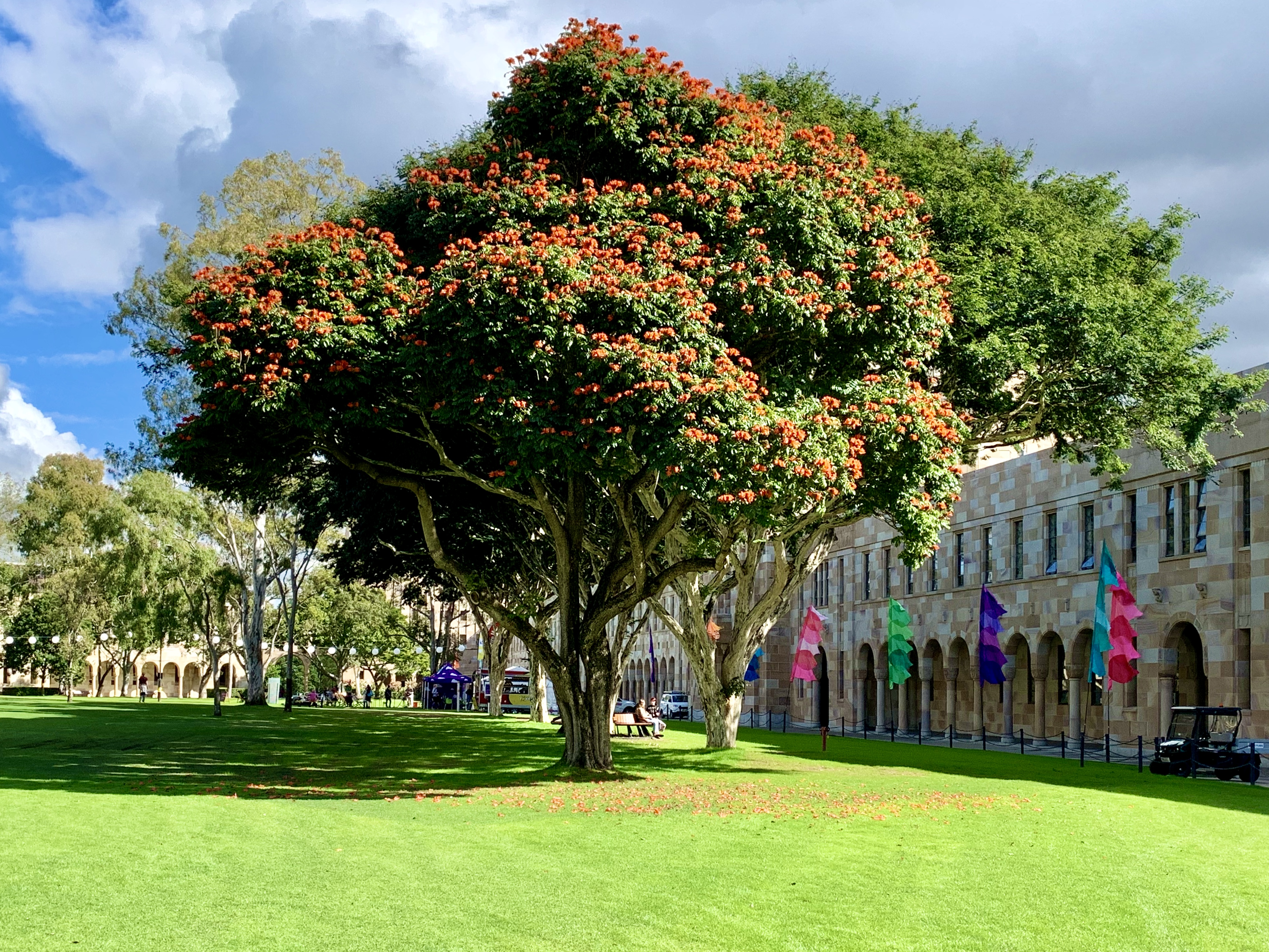
Buildings surrounding the Great Court

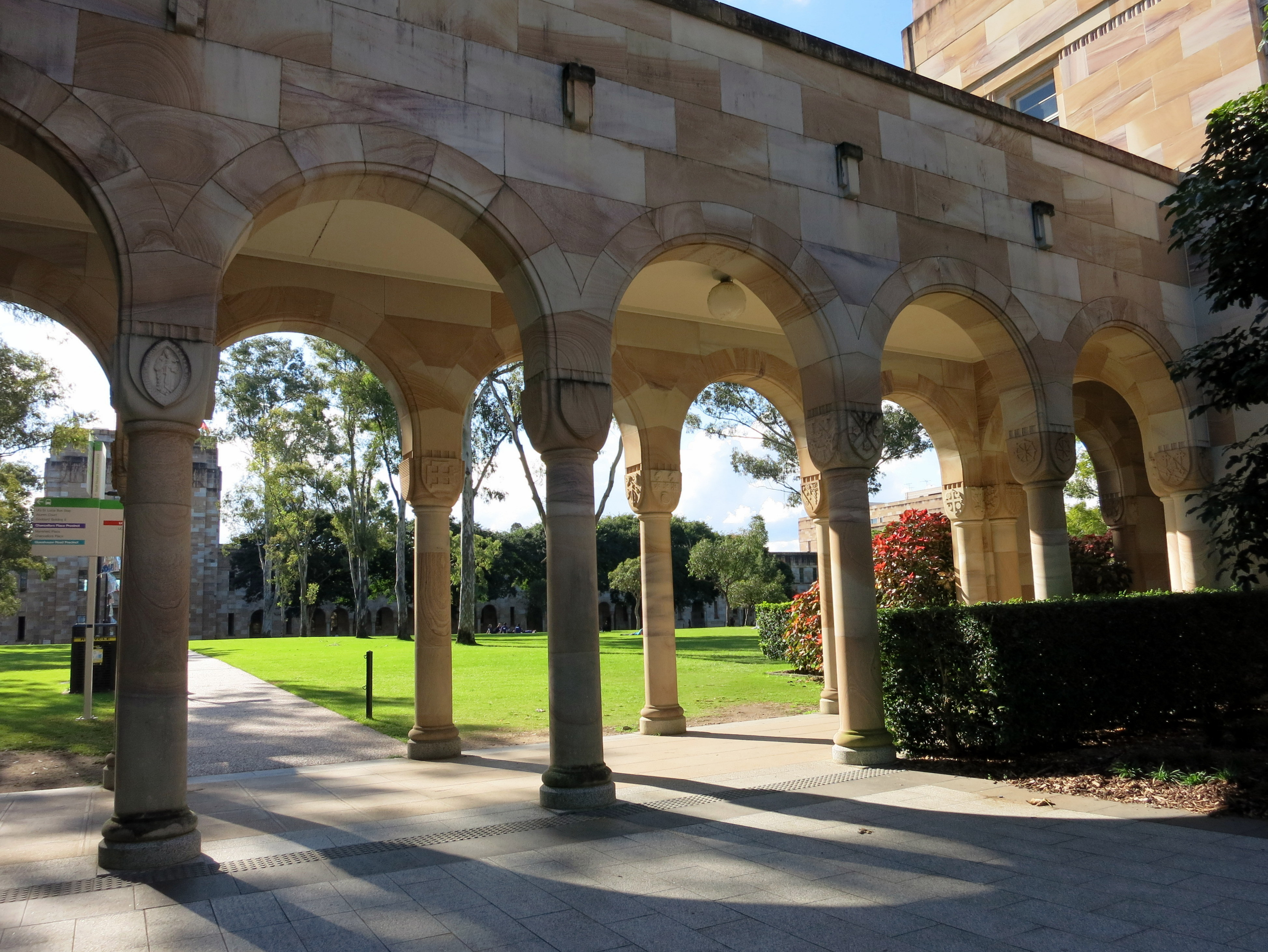
Covered walkway at the southern edge of the Great Court

The foundation stone was laid in 1937 by Forgan Smith but it was another year before building commenced. Construction began in March 1938 with the main building, now known as the Forgan Smith Building, and was followed shortly afterward with the lower floors of the library and the Chemistry building. It was to proceed, due to financial constraints, in stages clockwise around the court.

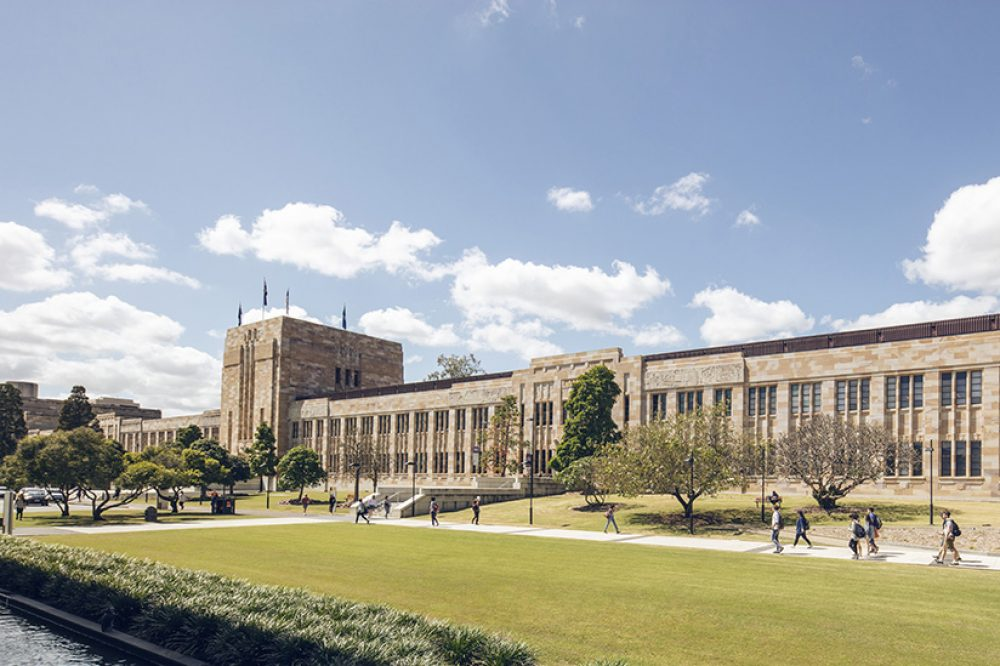
Steele Building borders the Great Court, 2004

Work was disrupted by the Second World War. The main building served its first use, from 1942 to 1944, as the headquarters of General Sir Thomas Blamey (head of the Australian Military Forces). The army evacuated the building and work re-commenced by 1948. The Forgan Smith Building was officially opened in May 1949 by Premier Ned Hanlon. The Duhig Library (two-stories only and named for Archbishop Sir James Duhig) was also ready by this time, as was the Steele Building (named for the first professor of chemistry, Professor Bertram Steele).

In 1951 the Richards Building (named for the first professor of geology, Henry Caselli Richards) was completed. In 1955 the Parnell Building (named for the inaugural professor of physics, Thomas Parnell) and an addition to the west wing of the Forgan Smith Building were completed. In 1962, jointly funded by state and commonwealth governments, the Goddard Building (named for the second professor of biology, Ernest James Goddard) was completed. In 1965 three extra floors were added to the Duhig Library to the design of James Birrell.

The final building at the western end of the Forgan Smith was to have been a Great Hall. John Douglas Story, the vice chancellor from 1938 until 1960, proposed in 1959 that this be replaced by a western Arts building and in 1972 construction began on the Michie Building (named for first the professor of classics, John Lundie Michie). The Queensland Government announced in 1974 that it would provide the funding to clad the building in sandstone. The Michie Building was completed in 1978.

In March 1979 the colonnade between the Michie Building and the Goddard Building was completed enclosing the Great Court Complex.

A number of changes have been made over the years to the Great Court Complex. Some of buildings have been augmented or altered: there are various structures on top of the Goddard Building, and a new, discreet addition to the Law Library at the western end of the Forgan Smith Building which was designed by Robert Riddell. Perhaps the most significant change is that the planting within the Court is less formal than originally intended, and takes little account of Hennessy's plans for strong visual axes to tie the whole Court together. Notable also in this respect are Professor Gareth Robert's master plan for the university which involved the closing of the circular drive and the placement of the Main Library and the Great Hall in front of the Forgan Smith Building.

In 2009 as part of the Q150 celebrations, the Great Court was announced as one of the Q150 Icons of Queensland for its role as a "structure and engineering feat".

=== The Sculptors ===
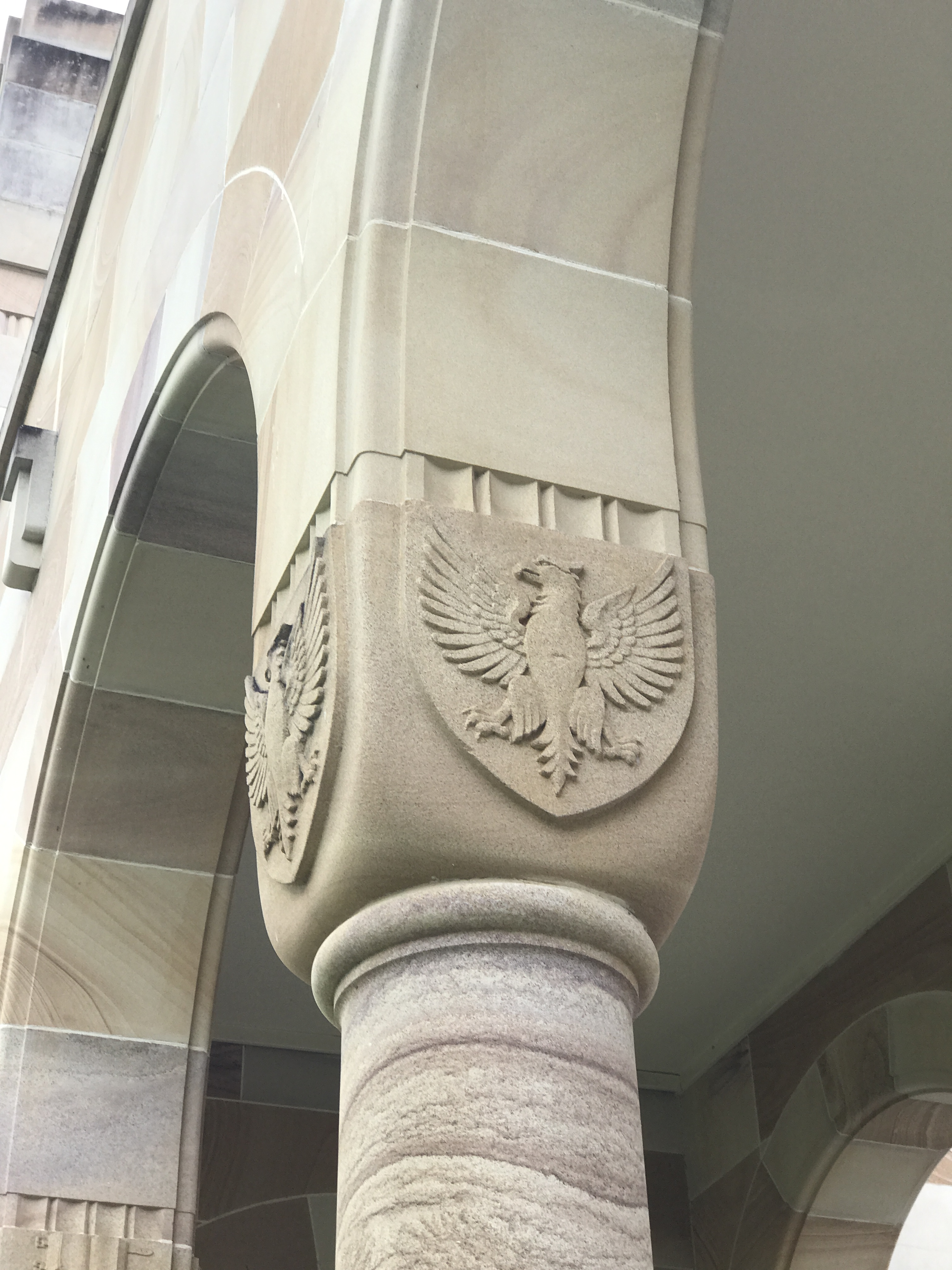
Carvings on the capitals of the columns, 2016

As part of Hennessy, Hennessy & Co's original concept, it was intended that the Great Court would include extensive sculptural work portraying historical panels, statues, coats of arms and panels of Australian plant and animal life. Many of the designs were drafted by Leo Drinan, who was the principal architect with Hennessy, Hennessy & Co. Work on the sculptures began in 1939, with German born John Theodore Muller and Frederick James McGowan as the principal stonemasons. Work was halted by the war in 1942 and McGowan died before it resumed three years later. Muller continued to carve until one year prior to his death at 80 years of age, in 1953. At the time of his death, some of the friezes, most of the statues, and half of the grotesques, coats of arms, and arch-voussoirs were completed.

Carving virtually stopped at the University after Muller's death and resumed only after the Michie Building was under construction. A competition among several Queensland sculptors and stone masons in 1976 led to the commissioning of Rhyl Hinwood. Hinwood has continued work as the University Sculptor. She has designed and carved numerous other parts of the walls of the Great Court, including 18 grotesques, coats of arms, arch-voussoirs, and the two monumental figures at the main entrance to the Goddard Building. Hinwood most recently completed the 50th--the last-- grotesque in 2025.

== Description ==
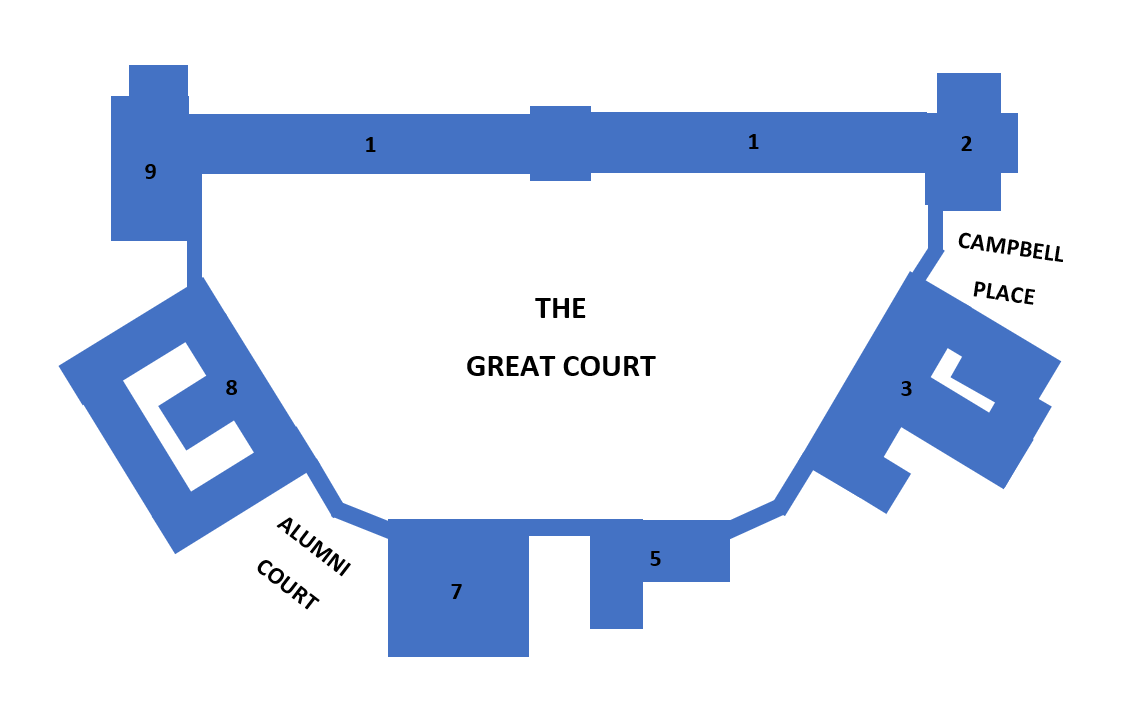
The layout of the Great Court. The buildings that comprise the Great Court are as follows: Forgan Smith Building (1), Duhig Tower (2), Steele Building (3), Richards Building (5), Parnell Building (7), Goddard Building (8) and Michie Building (9).

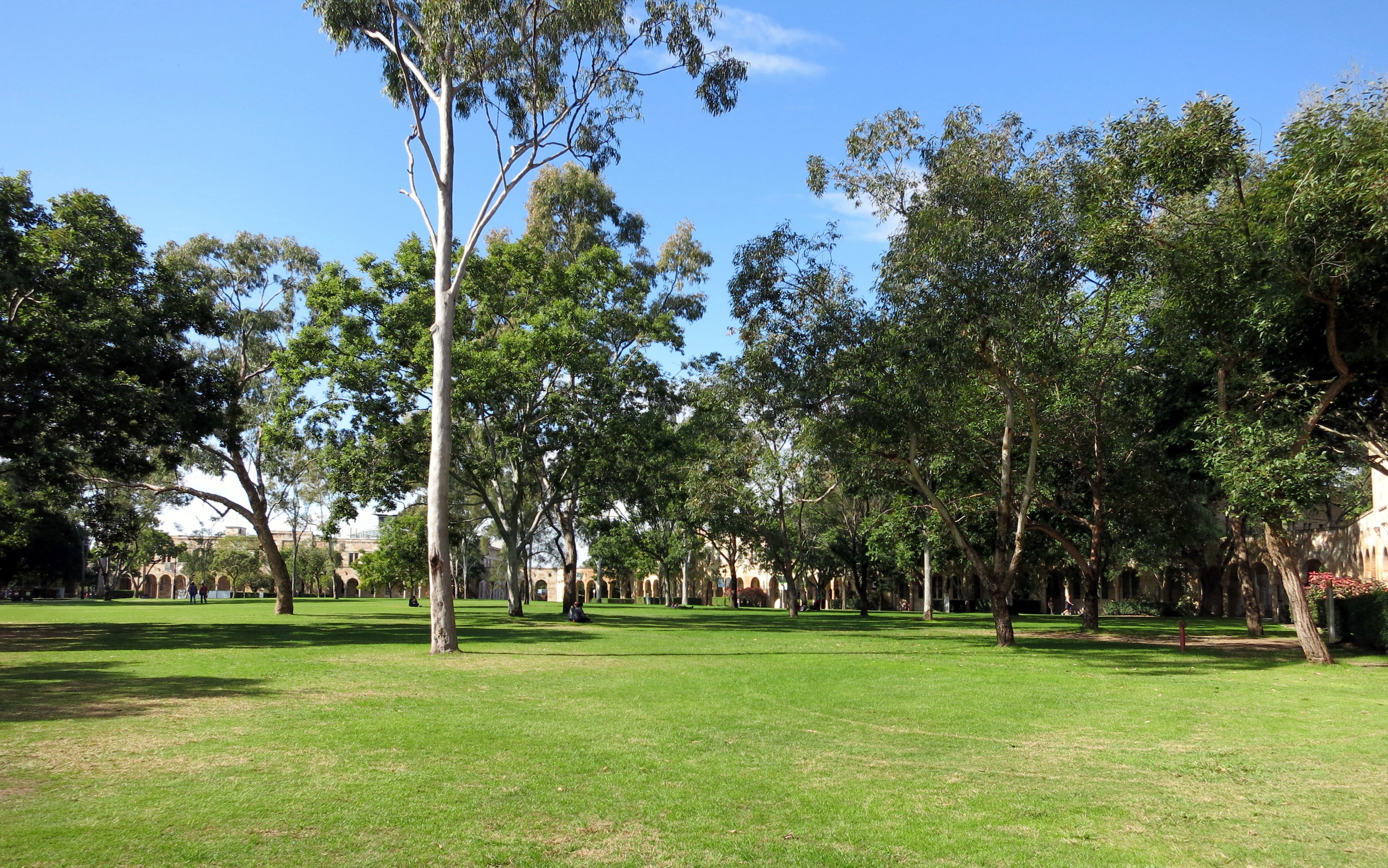
Part of the grassed area in the centre of the Great Court

The Great Court Complex is set on the high ground in the centre of a site enclosed by Cemetery Reach, a bend in the Brisbane River, on the northern, eastern and southern sides, and St Lucia, a residential suburb, on the west. The Court, approximately semicircular in plan with eight unequal sides, is an open grassed space planted intermittently with trees and shrubs and intersected by an axially placed path. The perimeter of the court consists of a continuous colonnade that links five detached buildings, all clad in Helidon sandstone of varying colours ranging from rich purples through to creams and browns. The largest of these, forming the long northern side of the court, is really a complex of three attached buildings. It consists of the centrally located Forgan Smith Building, flanked by the Michie Building at the western end and Duhig Library to the east. The other buildings which face onto the central court are, moving around the perimeter clockwise from the Duhig Library, the Steele Building, the Richards Building, the Parnell Building and the Goddard Building.

== Heritage listing ==
University of Queensland, Great Court Complex was listed on the Queensland Heritage Register on 8 March 2002 having satisfied the following criteria.

The place is important in demonstrating the evolution or pattern of Queensland's history.

The University of Queensland, established in 1909, commemorates Queensland's 50th anniversary of its separation from the colony of New South Wales. As the state's first university, it demonstrates the gradual evolution of higher education in Queensland, which was considered a low budget priority despite recommendations made to the Government as early as the 1870s.

The selection of a permanent site for the university was the subject of intense government and community debate in 1926. The eventual acquisition of land at St Lucia is strongly associated with Dr James O'Neil Mayne and his sister, Mary Emilia Mayne who made £50,000 available for the Brisbane City Council to purchase the property. In 1935, its Silver Jubilee year, the University decided to commence construction at the St Lucia site. The project was one of the Forgan Smith government's major developments of the 1930s depression years, specifically aimed at creating employment. The premier's involvement is commemorated in the naming of the first completed building on the site. Between 1942 and 1945 the university played an important role in the activities of the Second World War when General Sir Thomas Blamey, head of the Australian Defence Forces, established the Forgan Smith Building as the Land Headquarters.

The place is important in demonstrating the principal characteristics of a particular class of cultural places.

The layout of the Great Court complex is the clearest and most intact example in Australia of a university set out in accordance with the innovative American collegiate planning principles introduced by Thomas Jefferson in the early 1800s. The Jeffersonian concept of an academic village is clearly demonstrated in the complex by the large, open central courtyard that is surrounded by interspersed pavilions representing different disciplines, linked together by internal colonnades. From its location on the highest rise of the land overlooking the surrounding campus buildings, the Great Court is regarded as an important visual symbol of and central core to the University of Queensland.

The place is important because of its aesthetic significance.

Built over a forty-year period between 1937 and 1979, the Great Court Complex is significant both architecturally and aesthetically as an extensive and distinctive example of Art Deco styling. Uniformity is an important attribute of the complex, demonstrated not only by congenial characteristics such as monumental scale and form, strong horizontal and vertical lines, and materials but also the abundant sculptural work such as friezes, statues, and grotesques depicting significant individuals and events in the history of the State, the Commonwealth and the University. The public interiors of the individual buildings, particularly those in the Forgan Smith Building, are of notable interest for the high quality detailing of its materials and finishes harmoniously executed in the same style as the exteriors.

The place has a strong or special association with a particular community or cultural group for social, cultural or spiritual reasons.

From its location on the highest rise of the land overlooking the surrounding campus buildings, the Great Court is regarded as an important visual symbol of and central core to the University of Queensland. Due to this symbolism, the complex has a strong association with past and present students and faculty members throughout the state.

The place has a special association with the life or work of a particular person, group or organisation of importance in Queensland's history.

The University of Queensland, Great Court Complex has a special association with the work of Hennessy, Hennessy & Co, prominent Australian architects with offices in Brisbane and Sydney, who were responsible for designing a number of institutional and educational complexes throughout Australia during the 1920s and 1930s. The original design for the university is regarded as their most aspiring proposal in Queensland and although not completed in its entirely, the Great Court complex part of the University generally conforms to the original plan.

The Great Court Complex also has a strong association with the notable craftsman, John Theodore Muller, a German stonemason responsible for completing much of the Great Court sculpture between 1939 and 1953 including the statues, friezes on the Forgan Smith and Steele Buildings: the distinctive frieze of prehistoric life on the Richards Building; and about half of the grotesques, coats of arms, arches and roundels. The sculptured works form an integral part of the Great Court Complex and represent an immense undertaking in stone.
