= Toowong (disambiguation) =

Toowong may refer to:

- Toowong, a suburb in Brisbane, Australia
  - Toowong Cemetery
  - Toowong FC, a football club
  - Toowong Municipal Library Building, a heritage-listed former library
  - Toowong railway station
  - Toowong Reach, a reach of the Brisbane River
  - Toowong Village, a shopping centre and office tower
  - Town of Toowong, a former local government area
  - Electoral district of Toowong, a former electoral district of the Queensland Legislative Assembly

== See also ==
- Towong, Victoria
