= Wickham Terrace Car Park =

Heritage-listed car park in Brisbane, Queensland

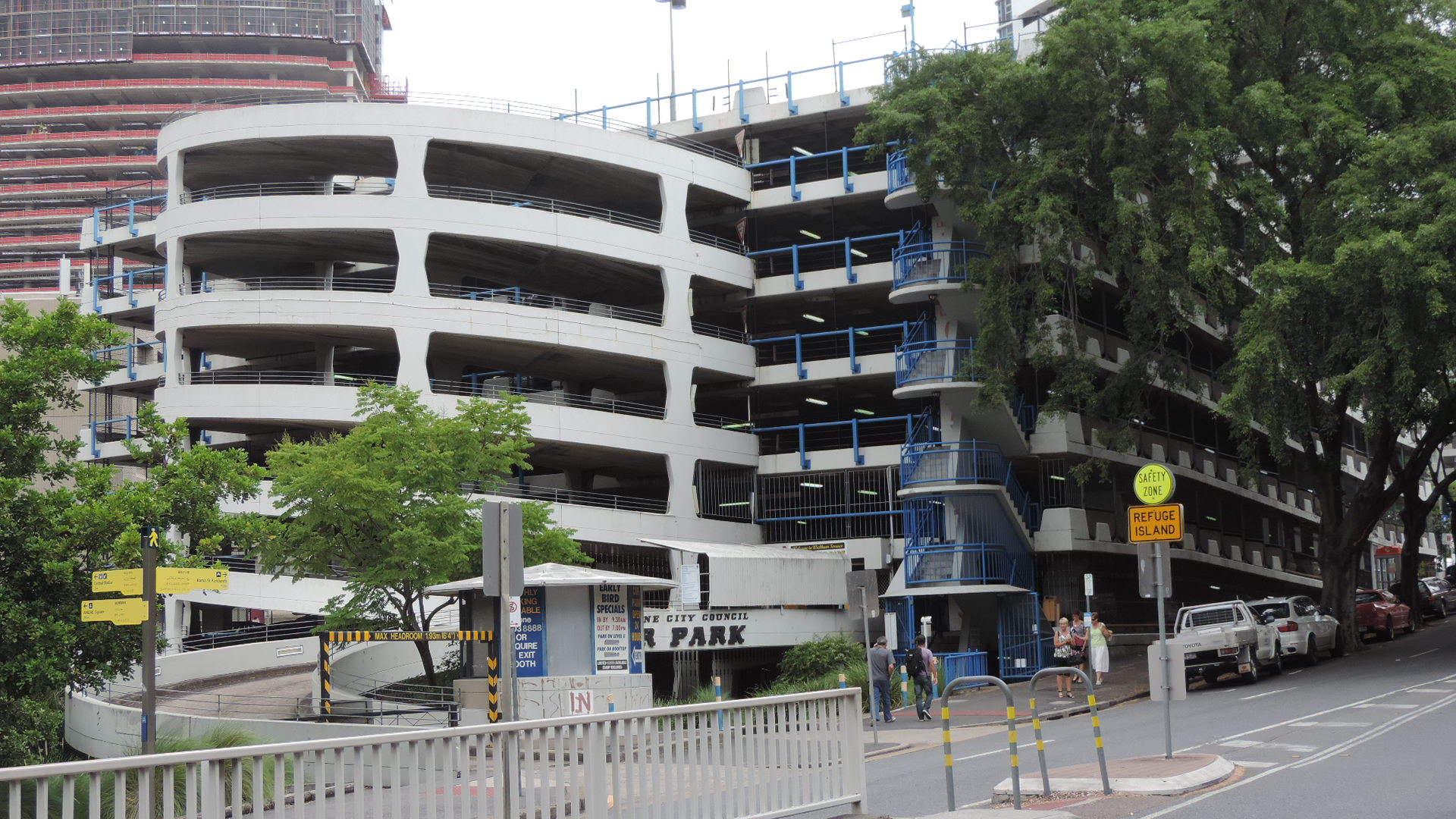
- Wickham Terrace Car Park (as seen from intersection of Wickham Terrace and Creek Street), 2015

- Location within Queensland Location within Australia
- 27.465°S 153.0257°E
- Location: 136 Wickham Terrace, Spring Hill, City of Brisbane, Queensland, Australia

History
- Design period: 1940s–1960s (post-World War II)
- Built: 1959–1960

Site notes
- Architect: James Birrell
- Architectural style: Functionalism

Queensland Heritage Register
- Official name: Brisbane City Council Carpark, Wickham Terrace Carpark
- Type: state heritage (built)
- Designated: 13 January 1995
- Reference no.: 601511
- Significant period: 1950s–1960s (historical); 1959–1960 (fabric)
- Significant components: steps/stairway, mural / fresco, ramp, views to, car park

Wickham Terrace Car Park is a heritage-listed multi-storey car park at 136 Wickham Terrace, Spring Hill, City of Brisbane, Queensland, Australia. It was designed by James Birrell and built from 1959 to 1960. It was added to the Queensland Heritage Register as Brisbane City Council Carpark on 13 January 1995.

== History ==
A multi-storeyed concrete structure, the Wickham Terrace Car Park was designed by James Birrell, the City Architect for the Brisbane City Council, and constructed during 1959 and 1960 by Thiess Brothers. The erection time for the complex was 14 months, at a cost of £535,000. It was the first parking station to be constructed by the Brisbane City Council and one of the first within the city area. The car park was built on a site which formerly housed a Red Cross workshop and garages.

Car ownership in Australia increased dramatically in the 1950s. In the ten years to 1962, statistics show an increase of from one car per nine people to one car per three and a half, or per family. Prior to 1960, car parking requirements had mostly been met by metered parking in the streets. Funds from parking meters were directed towards the construction costs of the new car park.

James Birrell was appointed Architect in charge of the Brisbane City Council Architectural Department at the age of 27 years and in this capacity oversaw more than 150 projects between 1955 and 1961. Preliminary sketches of the car park project were published in the journal Architecture and Arts in January 1958 and revised versions of the design subsequently appeared in other architectural journals. The car park was Birrell's largest, and one of his last, projects for the Brisbane City Council. It was one of the first major off-form concrete structures in Brisbane. Other buildings designed by Birrell for the Brisbane City Council included libraries at Annerley (1956–57), Chermside (1957–58) and Toowong (1959–60), and swimming pools including Toowong Swimming Pool (1957–59) and the Centenary Pool Complex (1959) in Spring Hill. Birrell was appointed Architect to the University of Queensland from 1961–66, overseeing the university's second major phase of construction development. His most notable buildings from this period include Union College, the JD Story Administration Building, Staff House and the Agriculture and Entomology Building. In 1966 he entered private practice.

Thiess Brothers, the builders for the project, were a construction firm which had previously been known for building tunnels in the Snowy Mountains. A vitrolite lined concrete tunnel connected the ca rpark with the Central Railway Station. Structural design was carried out by the engineers Macdonald Wagner and Priddle. The concrete relief which decorates the lift tower at the southern end of the car park was designed by Jim Meldrum.

Two more floors were later added to the top of the building to increase the capacity of the car park. The height of the semicircular ramp was also increased to provide access to the additional floors. The original entry arrangements were altered to provide access from Turbot Street, with detail drawings of this dated 1975, and a new staircase was added to the north east corner of the building in 1992. Sections of the off-form concrete have been painted.

== Description ==
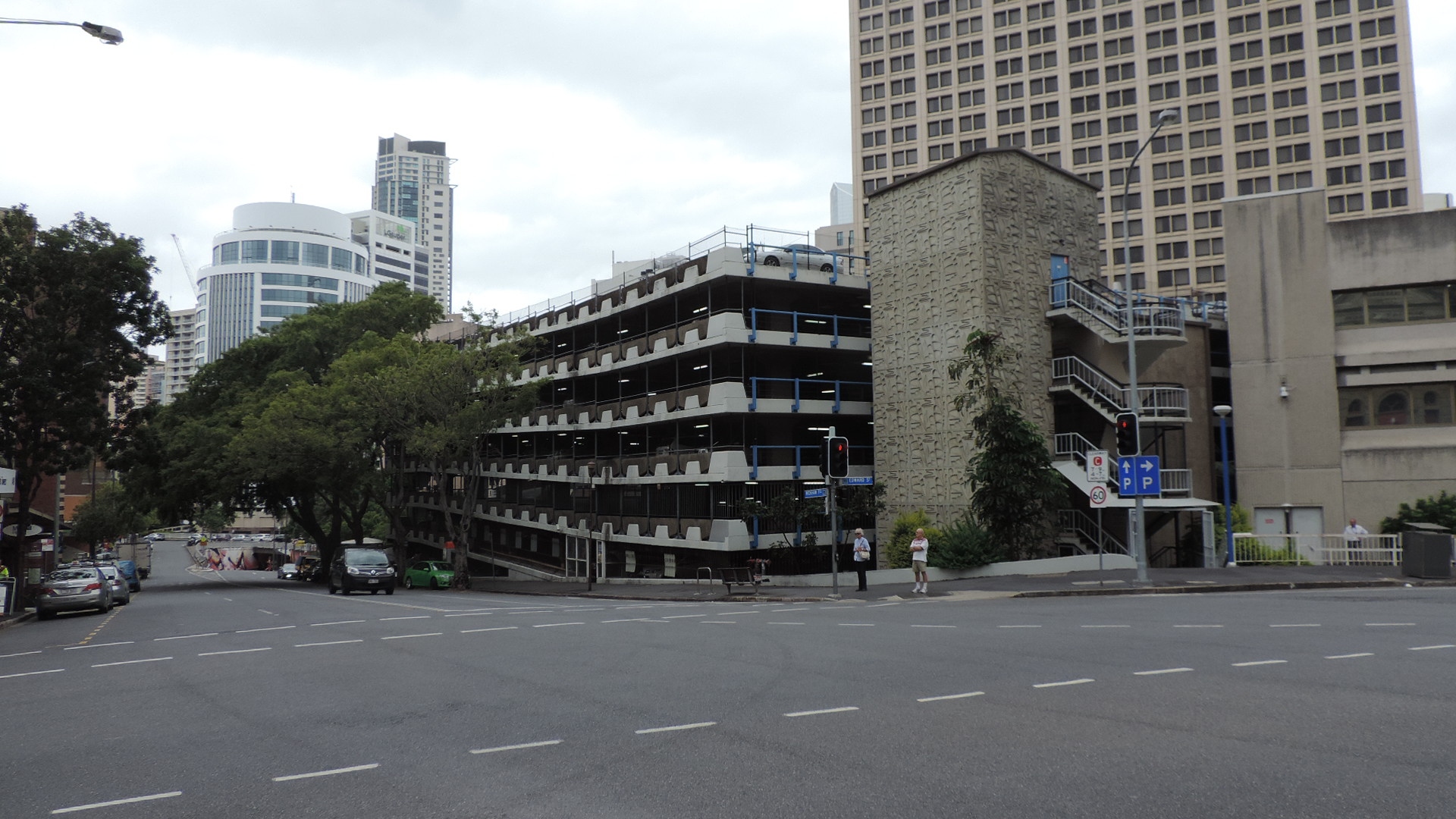
Wickham Terrace Car Park (as seen from intersection of Wickham Terrace and Upper Edward Street), 2015

The Wickham Terrace Car Park is a multi-storeyed reinforced concrete structure located on a steeply sloping site at the edge of the Brisbane central business district. Occupying an elevated position between Wickham Terrace and Turbot Streets the building overlooks the Central Railway Station to which it is connected by a tunnel.

The entire structure, which has gently sloping floors, is a ramp which facilitates movement by cars upwards through the building. It originally consisted of seven levels at the Edward Street end and eight levels at the opposite end. Two more floors have been added to the top of the building. Due to the sloping site three floors are below the level of Wickham Terrace. Entry to the building is at the lowest level from Turbot Street. The main exit ramp, an addition, is roofed and leads to either Turbot Street or Wickham Terrace. The original entrance and exit ramps from Wickham Terrace remain but appear to be infrequently used.

An open structure, the car park consists primarily of a grid of rectangular concrete columns with flared tops supporting waffle slabs which form the floors. Precast concrete panels with an exposed aggregate finish form the balustrades on the Turbot Street and Wickham Terrace elevations. Balustrading elsewhere consists of painted square sectioned steel posts attached to the outside face of the building which support steel pipe handrails. Horizontal steel rods secured with steel springs have been added as supplementary balustrading. The original security screen on the Wickham Terrace elevation is a series of vertical steel rods fixed to the floor slabs with springs.

Attached to the main structure near the Edward Street and Wickham Terrace corner is a lift tower and staircase. This vertical service structure incorporates rooms on a number of levels which were originally used for such purposes as kiosk, office and public toilets. It is connected at the lowest level to the tunnel, now lined with ceramic tiles, which links the car park to the Central Railway Station and Anzac Square. The lift tower is clad with a concrete curtain wall decorated by a relief pattern. This concrete relief pattern consists of recessed abstract shapes laid out in a repetitive grid. The staircase, which juts out beyond the lift tower, is a prominent feature with sculptural supports and cantilevered semicircular landings. The staircase has a steel rod and pipe balustrade. The floor of the lift foyer and the staircase is tiled in green and white mosaic tiles.

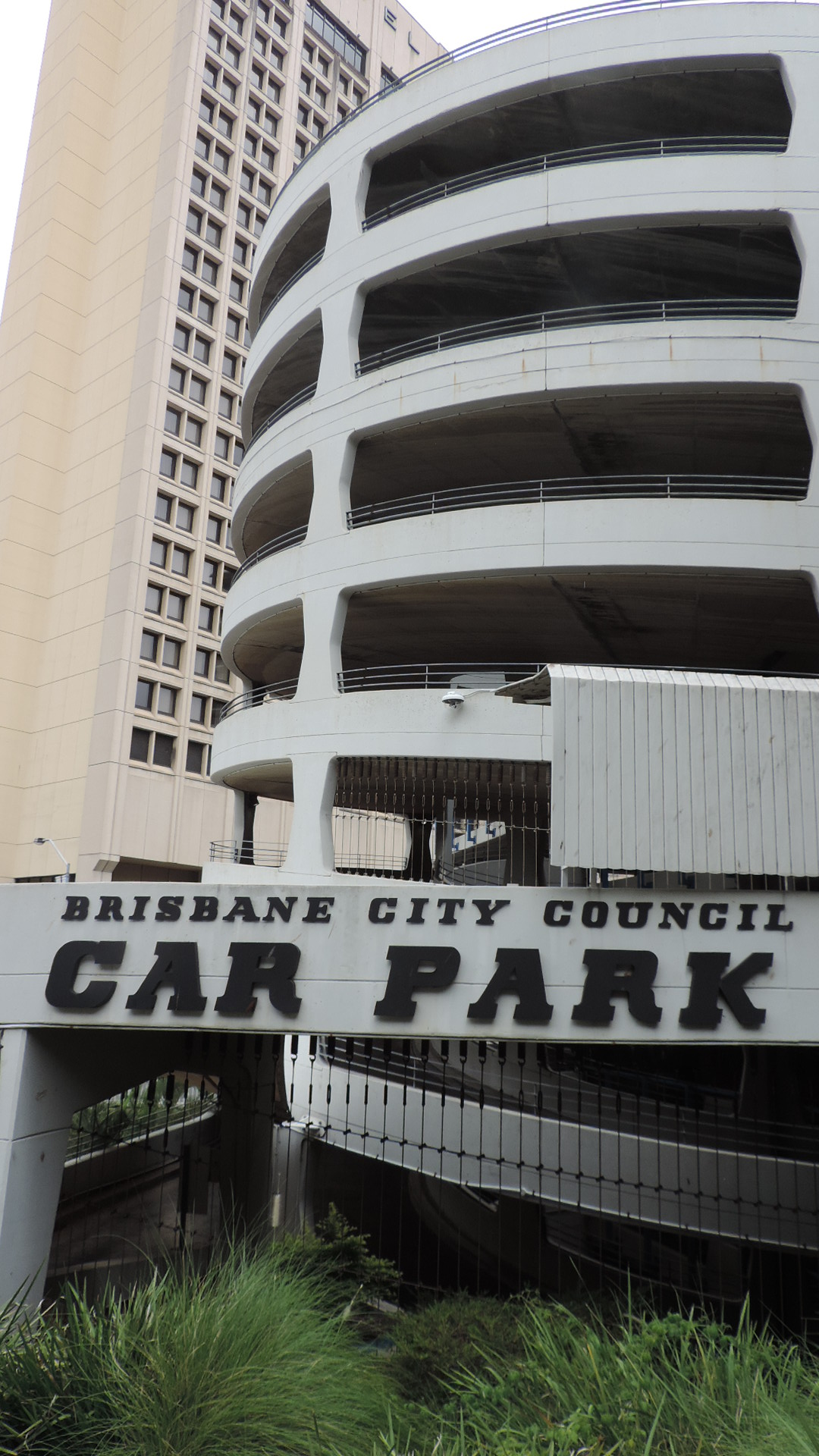
Dramatic semicircular ramp, 2015

Dominating the eastern end of the building is a dramatic semicircular ramp which is used by cars exiting the building. A concrete staircase, similar in style to the original stair on the western end now protrudes from the north east corner. A freestanding circular room, which originally acted as the main control point, is located between the two ramps from Wickham Street.

Concrete finishes throughout the building were originally off-form, an unrendered surface where the impressions left by the formwork provide decorative effect. Parts of the building have subsequently been painted. New galvanised steel balustrading and security grilles have been installed.

== Heritage listing ==
The Wickham Terrace Car Park was listed on the Queensland Heritage Register on 13 January 1995, having satisfied the following criteria.

The place is important in demonstrating the evolution or pattern of Queensland's history.

The Wickham Terrace Car Park is an important example of a late 1950s interpretation of the functionalist idiom in a car park design.

The car park is a powerful symbol of modernity and change. The prominence of the building and its assertive architectural style demonstrate the increased visibility and importance of the car in Australian culture during the 1950s.

The place is important in demonstrating the principal characteristics of a particular class of cultural places.

Under the direction of City Architect James Birrell, the car park contributed to the tradition of high quality civic architecture established by the Brisbane City Council. Birrell, a leading modernist architect of the 1950s and 1960s, was responsible for many designs during his term of employment with the council. The car park, his last major work for the council, is a significant example of his work.

The place is important because of its aesthetic significance.

The building, through its dramatic sculptural forms and textured surfaces, introduced the aesthetic possibilities of off-form concrete construction to Brisbane.

The place is important in demonstrating a high degree of creative or technical achievement at a particular period.

The building, through its dramatic sculptural forms and textured surfaces, introduced the aesthetic possibilities of off-form concrete construction to Brisbane.
