= Rhyl Hinwood =

Australian sculptor

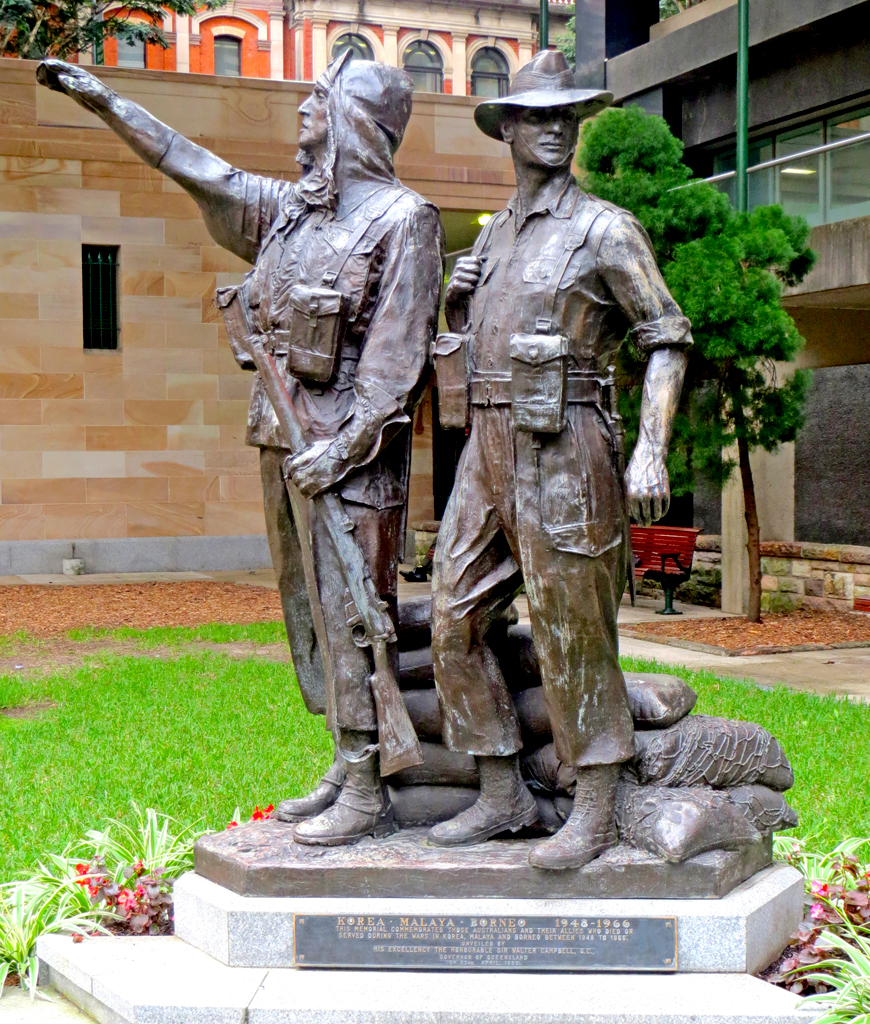
Korea, Malaya, and Borneo conflicts 1948 - 1966 Memorial, Anzac Square, Brisbane, by Rhyl Hinwood

Rhyl Kingston Hinwood (born 1940) is a sculptor in Brisbane, Queensland, Australia. She designed and produced over seven hundred commissioned public artworks. In 2006 she became a Member of the Order of Australia for "service to the arts as a sculptor of artworks for public places and buildings, and through teaching roles and support for students".

== Early life ==
Rhyl Hinwood (née Jones) was born in Brisbane in 1940 to Charted Secretary Reuben Morton Jones, and artist Edith May "Maisie" Rouche. Her parents encouraged Hinwood's interests in art.

Hinwood attended primary school at Yeronga State School and high school at Somerville House. It was at Somerville House Hinwood discovered sculpture.

After completing her schooling, Hinwood studied art at the Central Technical College, under instructors such as George Virine.

== Later life and career ==
From 1958 to 1962, Hinwood worked as an artist in the Queensland Natural History Museum. She lost that job when she married, but continued to work at her art.

In 1976, Hinwood won a national competition to complete the set of carvings by Johannes Theodor Müller and others between 1939 and 1952, of the Great Court of University of Queensland. By October 2025, she had completed over 250 works for the university including historical panels, statues, coats of arms, and panels of Australian plant and animal life. She also completed the final, 50th grotesque.

In addition to the work in the Great Court, she also carved the sculptures for the university's Wordsmiths Cafe using themes inspired by the University of Queensland Press.

In 1986, Hinwood won a Winston Churchill Memorial Fellowship for sculpture.

In 1987 she was chosen to create the ceramic Australian coat of arms for the House of Representatives in Parliament House, Canberra, Australian Capital Territory. This was the first art work commissioned and completed for Australia's new parliament house.

A documentary in 1993 entitled In pursuit of excellence, celebrated the work of Hinwood.

In 2001, Hinwood was awarded an Honorary Doctor of Philosophy by the university, for her "outstanding contribution to the visual arts in Queensland".

In 2012, Hinwood developed a database of the university's sandstone carvings. In 2016, she collaborated with the university's Office of Marketing and Communications to update a book for visitors to the Great Court, Carving a history: A guide to the Great Court.

In 2021, the University of Queensland published a book containing full-color images of Hinwood's sculptures and her memoir: A sculptor's vision – Creating a legacy in stone.

== Personal life ==
In 1962, Hinwood married and changed her name to Shepherd. She had two children.

After 1975, Hinwood married fellow artist Robert Hinwood (1930 – 2023).
