= Bertram Steele =

Bertram Dillon Steele
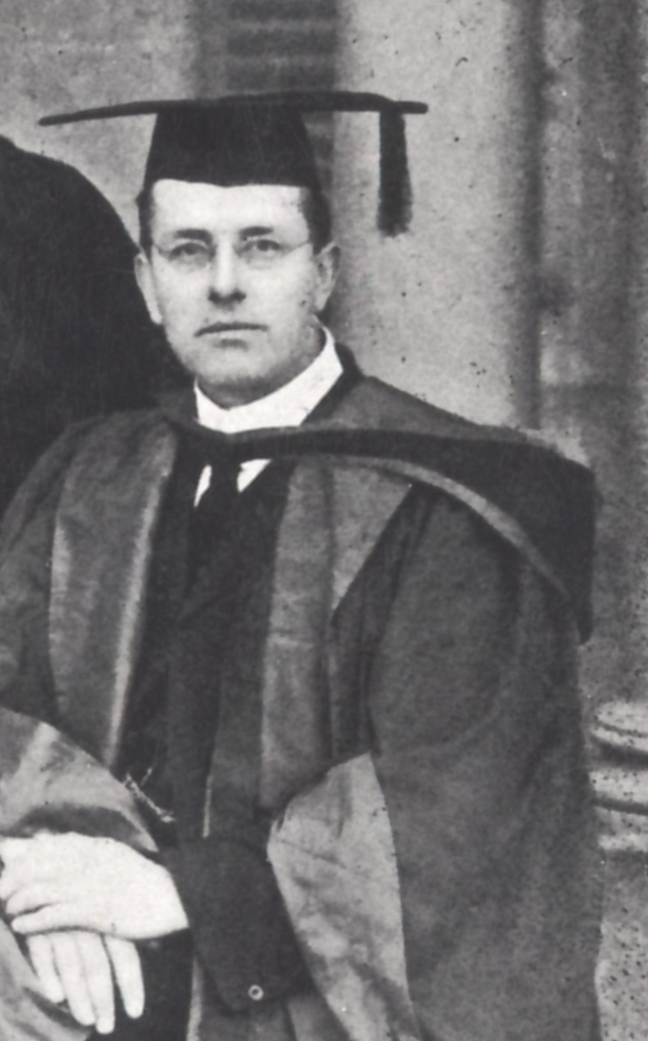
- Steele in 1911
- Born: 30 May 1870; Plymouth, Devon, England
- Died: 12 April 1934 (aged 63)
- Education: Victorian College of Pharmacy, University of Melbourne,
- Scientific career
- Fields: Chemist

Bertram Dillon Steele FRS (30 May 1870 – 12 April 1934) was an Australian scientist, foundation professor of chemistry at the University of Queensland.

Steele was born in Plymouth, England, to Samuel Madden Steele, a surgeon, and his wife Hariette Sarah, née Acock. Steele was educated at the Plymouth Grammar School; he then began an apprenticeship with his father. Steele migrated to Australia in 1889. He studied as a pharmaceutical chemist at the Victorian College of Pharmacy where he won a gold medal in 1890. He then practised as a pharmacist.

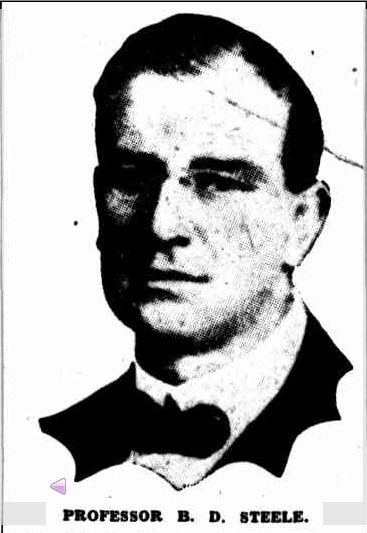
Prof Steele, later in life

A major building fronting the Great Court of the University of Queensland is named for him. An annual lecture is given in his name at the university, since 1982.
