= George Virine =

Russian sculptor (1920–2017)

George Virine (1920–2017) was a Russian-Australian sculptor. He taught art and exhibited his work in France and Australia. He worked in the classic realism style.

== Early life ==
George Michael Virine was born Yuri Millievich Ezersky on March 15, 1920 in Moscow, Russia. His father Millievich Ezersky was an academic and writer and his mother Zinaida worked in the costume production unit of the Bolshoi Ballet. The young Ezersky studied classical art and was conscripted into the Red Army in 1939. After training in Mongolia, his unit was sent to Smolensk and they were bombed during the battle of Smolensk. He was arrested by the Germans and eventually sent to a prison camp in Poland. After escaping this camp, he was transferred to Buchenwald concentration camp. Again Ezersky escaped and travelled west. Following the war, he continued working as a sculptor of souvenir goods in Luxembourg, despite lacking identity papers. He changed his name to Juri Wiardo. After Soviet secret police were detected in Luxembourg, he moved to Paris, France where he sculpted artwork for movie theatres. He changed his name to George Virine and studied in Paris and his works showed at the Salon de Vedettes in 1950. His work was admired by Pablo Picasso but Virine objected to Picasso's communist sympathies.

== Emigration to Australia ==
Virine applied for refugee entry to Australia in 1951. His wife followed him shortly after. They moved from Sydney to Brisbane after an unsuccessful exhibition and he took up work as a house painter. After his work showed at Finney's Art Gallery (David Jones department store) in 1955, he was invited to teach sculpture, modelling and art restoration at the Brisbane Central Technical College (now QUT). He served as the sculpture instructor from 1958, helping train many young sculptors including Rhyl Hinwood and Philip Piperides, until he resigned in 1976. He operated a private studio at Kangaroo Point and at Rochedale in Brisbane until his mid 90s.

== Significant work ==
Virine's work is held in many collections.

- Six foot bust of Bert Hinkler, in Bundaberg, Queensland, 1959
- 3 foot medallion of King George VI, 1955
- Statue of St Vladimir, The University of Queensland, 1993
- Bust of James Cook, James Cook University
- Bust of Sir Winston Churchill, 1966

== Personal life ==
Virine married Irina Pavlenko in St Etienne, France. They had three children. He died on 1 June 2017 and was survived by his daughters Galina and Tatiana.

== Awards ==
1964, first place in John Birch Society international competition

== Legacy ==
The Queensland Museum and State Library of Queensland hold selected papers from George Virine's private collection. His sculptures are a part of a number of university collections.
