= Johannes Theodor Müller =

German/Australian sculptor

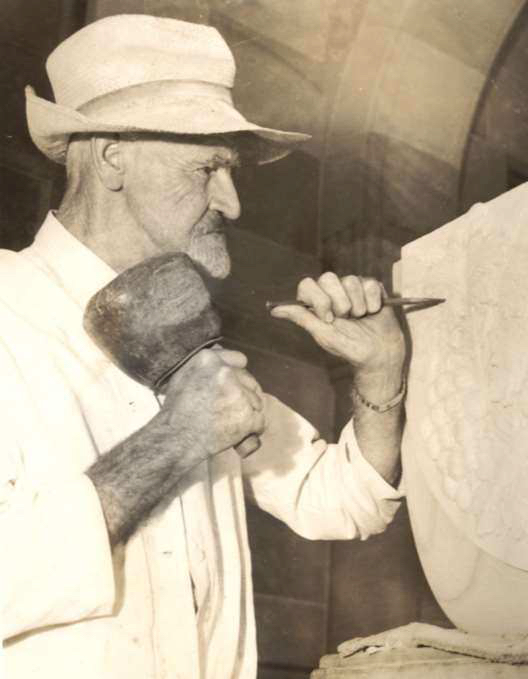
Johannes Theodor Müller (ca. 1950)

Johannes Theodor Müller (28 November 1873 – 15 March 1953) also known as John Theodore Muller, was a German-Australian sculptor, best known for his carvings on the sandstone walls of University of Queensland's Great Court at its St Lucia campus in Brisbane.

== Life and career ==
According to Müller's biographer, John East, information about Müller's life is scanty because all his records were destroyed in a fire at his home on 5 July 1952. Nevertheless East was able to retrieve sufficient official records and other sources for his biography.

Müller was born on 28 November 1873 in Schandau, now known as Bad Schandau, Germany, then part of the Kingdom of Saxony. Müller was the fifth child of Carl Gottlob Müller (a member of the Royal Saxon Army, guarding the nearby border with Bohemia, now the Czech Republic) and Emma Alwine, née Gräfe.

After working briefly in London, in 1901 Müller began working in Berlin. In 1903, Müller travelled to Sydney Australia to begin a three-year contract with Wunderlich Limited making clay models of designs to be stamped into tin ceilings. He stayed with the company for eight years.

In 1905, Müller married and began raising a family. In 1908, he became a citizen of Australia. In 1911, Müller and his family moved to Brisbane where he established his own business, but then resumed employment at a new factory Wunderlich had opened in the city.

In the 1920s, Müller became involved with masonry work as a subcontractor, including on Brisbane's Treasury Building, on the Masonic Temple, and on the Brisbane City Hall. Müller's work on the city hall included carving lions' heads into the sandstone facings of the building.

In late 1929, Müller served as the chief assistant stone carver to Daphne Mayo who was responsible for the large tympanum crowning the central portico of the Brisbane City Hall.

After 1930, the Great Depression reduced building activity. In 1932, the Queensland State Government commenced large-scale construction of public buildings, including, in 1938, the University of Queensland at St Lucia. In 1939, Müller, Frederick McGowan (a Sydney stonemason), and Frederick Pilling (who had worked with Müller on the city hall) began carving decorations into the Helidon freestone facings. This was curtailed by the start of World War II. McGowan and Pilling both died in 1942, by which time Müller had resumed carving the decorations, including grotesques, for which Müller had complete artistic freedom.

Müller continued to work on the decorations until 1951 when ill-health forced him to take a break for several months. In April 1952 illness prevented him from doing any more work.

== Personal life ==
In January 1905, Müller married Kate Rose, a teacher who was 10 years younger than Müller. They had two children: a son, Max, in 1906, and a daughter, Louise, in 1907.

Müller died on 15 March 1953; Kate died on 26 July 1953.

== See also ==
- Queensland University's second sculptor, Rhyl Hinwood
