= Centenary Pool Complex =

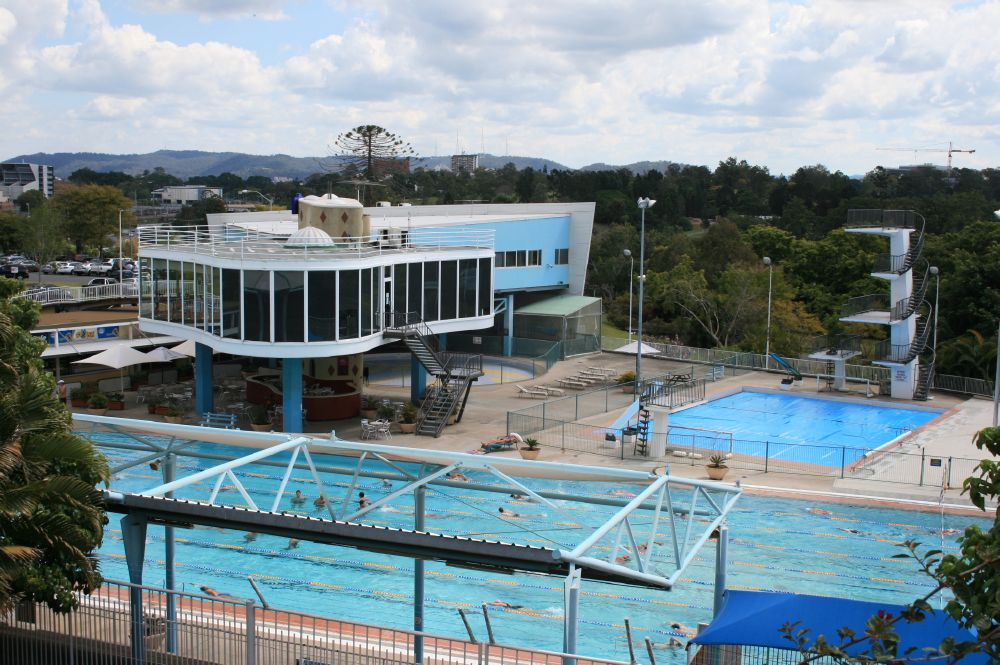
- Interactive map of Centenary Pool Complex
- 27.4549°S 153.0259°E
- Location: 400 Gregory Terrace, Spring Hill, City of Brisbane, Queensland, Australia

History
- Design period: 1940s–1960s (post-World War II)
- Built: 1959
- Built for: Brisbane City Council

Site notes
- Architect: James Birrell
- Architectural style: Post-War International
- Owner: Brisbane City Council

Queensland Heritage Register
- Official name: Centenary Pool Complex
- Type: state heritage (built)
- Designated: 5 November 1996
- Reference no.: 601240
- Significant period: 1959 (fabric); 1959–1980 (historical, social)
- Significant components: trees/plantings, swimming pool, tower – diving, restaurant, bathroom/bathhouse, grandstand, kiosk
- Builders: Cyril Porter Hornick

Centenary Pool Complex is a heritage-listed swimming pool at 400 Gregory Terrace, Spring Hill, City of Brisbane, Queensland, Australia. It was designed by architect James Birrell and built in 1959. It was added to the Queensland Heritage Register on 5 November 1996.

== History ==
The Centenary Pool complex was constructed in 1959 by the Brisbane City Council, as its principal contribution to the celebrations marking the centenary of local government in Brisbane, proclaimed a City in October 1859, and the proclamation of the separation of Queensland from New South Wales in December 1859.

The complex was designed by Brisbane City Architect James Birrell and his staff, who commenced work on the design in 1957, and was completed in November 1959 at a cost of approximately £150,000. The contractor was Brisbane Master Builder, Cyril Porter Hornick. The project was Brisbane's first Olympic standard pool and diving pool complex and, until the construction of the Sleeman Sports Complex at Chandler in 1980, remained Brisbane's principal aquatic sports centre. The inclusion of an up-market restaurant was an innovative concept which raised the status of the complex above that of simply a sports facility.

The City Council's choice of a pool complex of Olympic standard, reflected the intense public interest in competitive swimming which had been generated by Australian successes at the 1956 Melbourne Olympic Games. Not only was Australia the proud host nation; at the Melbourne Olympics, Australia produced its best performance ever, winning 13 gold medals - 8 in swimming events. Throughout Australia, the popularity of competitive swimming surged, and in the ten years following the Olympics, the Brisbane City Council built seven new public swimming pools. Of these, the Centenary complex was the only one to incorporate diving facilities. The BCC was keen to include a wading pool in the Centenary complex, one of its principal objectives being to provide facilities for children of an early age to be taught to swim.

Centenary Pool was the first public pool complex to be designed by the City Architect rather than by the City Engineers. The Langlands Park pool, the first public swimming pool built by the Council since the early 1930s, was completed in 1958 with some involvement from James Birrell, but had been started by the Engineering Department.

On a national level, Centenary Pool was an Olympic-size pool similar to the Melbourne and Canberra Olympic Pools constructed in 1955. As a type, all three are significant as constructed either for, or as a direct result of, the Melbourne Olympic Games.

James Birrell, Brisbane's City Architect from 1955 to 1961, produced a substantial body of civic work for the Brisbane City Council, including the Wickham Terrace Car Park, the former Toowong Municipal Library Building, Toowong Pool, and various suburban libraries. Of his civic work, the Centenary Pool Complex and the Wickham Terrace Carpark are his most important designs. From 1961 to 1966, Birrell was appointed Architect to the University of Queensland, overseeing the university's second major phase of construction development. His most notable buildings from this period include Union College, the JD Story Administration Building, Staff House and the Agriculture and Entomology Building (the Hartley Teakle building). In 1966 he entered private practice.

Birrell had a talent for exploring new and exciting architectural trends, and of translating these to the Brisbane context. This is demonstrated in the design of the Centenary Pool Complex, which is unlike any of Birrell's other work, and is not in the mainstream of modern international style architecture that was being practised in Australia in the 1950s. It is more closely related to the work of Oscar Niemeyer, (one of the principal designers of Brazil's new capital, Brasília, in the 1950s and 1960s. Like Niemeyer, Birrell attempted to create in the Centenary Pool design a work of art rather than a purely functionalist structure.

Like many architects of the 1950s, Birrell experimented with using familiar materials and technology in unfamiliar ways. The most innovative use of material in the Centenary Pool complex was in the structural steel in the restaurant and diving tower. Birrell utilised the skills of Brisbane shipbuilders Evans Deakin and Company to shape the top and bottom beams of the restaurant, and of local steel fabricators Sargeants to bend the steel core of the diving tower.

The complex was designed to fit into the slope of the hill overlooking Victoria Park, and little excavation was required. On technical aspects of the pool's construction, such as the size and positioning of the filtration equipment, Birrell worked closely with the Brisbane City Council's Chief Health Officer, James Douglas Mabbett.

Underwater floodlighting and observation windows were included in the design, to permit coaches to view their pupils in action from below the surface. These features were highlighted at the official opening of the pool on the evening of 25 November 1959, when the Governor of Queensland, Sir Henry Abel Smith, was treated to an underwater diving display, viewed through the observation window to the diving pool.

The initial design of the complex included a landscaped entrance road and carpark to the south of the pool. Queensland subtropical landscape designer Harry Oakman, who was then manager of the BCC's Parks Department, is understood to have been responsible for the landscape design.

In 1960 the Centenary Pool complex was selected by the editors of the Melbourne publication Architecture and Arts as one of the top ten buildings in Australia. It was also the sole Queensland entry in the 1961 publication New Buildings in the Commonwealth, Australian material for which was compiled by Robin Boyd.

By 2009, the restaurant had been replaced by a gym and medical suites.

== Description ==
The Centenary Pool complex comprises pools (a swimming pool, diving pool with diving boards and wading pool), a grandstand, a single storeyed bath house, and a two-storeyed restaurant and kiosk. These structures sit on a podium which is set into the north-eastern slope of Victoria Park. Constructed in concrete, steel, brick and glass, the elements of the pool form a loose composition of geometric and plastic forms. The complex is modernist-influenced in both design conception and detailing; in particular the buildings are related to the plastic expressionism of modernist architects and artists such as Oscar Niemeyer and Hans Arp.

The design of the pool complex was described by the architect in a brochure celebrating the opening of the pool: "The pools are arranged in a random manner so the festive air is developed. Pools in line become too regimented for a park setting....The general aesthetic scheme is that of a free form shape pierced with geometric incisions, that is the concourse with the pools in it. ...hovering above this is another free form volume with geometric shapes placed in it, that is the restaurant with access stairs, ceiling lights and the roof terrace". (Birrell, 1959)

The boundaries of the complex form a fluid rhomboid shape. Within this boundary the pools and buildings relate to a bisecting north-south axis which extends through the park and finishes at the facade of the University of Queensland Mayne Medical School. The axis locates the central concourse. To the east of this concourse is the swimming pool, measuring 165 by 60 feet (50 by 18 m), whose eastern edge is lined by a stepped concrete grandstand (designed to seat 1200). The diving pool, measuring 90 by 60 feet (27 by 18 m), is located in the north west corner of the site and has a four-level diving tower to its western end, and single level boards at each end. A round wading pool is located in the south west corner of the site. The bath house comprises a long curved building which hugs the edge of the slope, and is entered via a ramp leading down to a central ticket office. The restaurant, a raised pavilion with curvilinear walls, also sits on axis and overhangs the swimming pool. The restaurant building contains a kiosk at ground level, and is entered via a concrete ramp which arches over the roof of the dressing sheds.

The buildings exhibit a combination of sculptural and technical inventiveness in their design and detailing. The curvilinear walls of the restaurant are formed with faceted glazed panels set in circular steel columns. The building has a curved off-centre service core containing open-riser concrete stairs spiralling around a concrete riser duct. The service core merges through the roof of the buildings to give access to a roof terrace via oval-shaped doors. The terrace is encircled by a steel balustrade with continuous horizontal rails. The service core is clad with glazed tiles with diamond motifs. The kiosk at ground level is rendered concrete, and has strip windows, a service counter, and T&G boarding running under counter height.

Internally, the restaurant is a fluid, transparent space, with the kitchen at the centre encircled by a curved wall clad in T&G boarding. The northern end of the restaurant has a raised round lit floor which has translucent glass panes set in a steel frame.

The bath house comprises a series of externally expressed steel portal frames, with a concave rendered concrete masonry wall to the south with obscured glass louvres at high level, a convex brick wall to the north with steel louvres, and a metal deck roof. It contains female dressing areas to the west, male dressing areas to the east, and administration, storage and ticketing areas in the centre, flanked by corridors giving access to the pools. The administration and ticketing areas are timber-lined. The change rooms have ceramic tiled floors, and rows of large concrete benches. The female change room has blue terrazzo partitions, while its male counterpart has grey terrazzo and blue glazed ceramic tiled partitions. Externally the brickwork is left unstruck, to express the plasticity of the material (Kennedy, 1993).

The pools and podium area also exhibit considered technical, decorative and sculptural detailing. The main pool has ceramic tiled rounded edging, a scupper channel to absorb waves, and hexagonal ceramic tiled patterns at the ends of the lanes on the floor of the pool. The wading pool is tiled in fluid abstract patterns. The diving boards are supported on splayed concrete columns, from which spring splayed cantilevered platforms, and steel balustrades and stairs with central steel stringers; the diving tower has curved stairs clinging to its northern face. The podium is paved with hexagonal concrete pavers flecked with exposed aggregate, and has raised seating and planting areas with hexagonal concrete edging. The diving pool and main pool have portholes which are accessed via a "clubroom" below podium level.

The complex has complementary "modern tropical" landscaping around its boundaries. The eastern and southern edges of the complex have domestically-scaled tracts of brightly coloured tropical plantings (for example Acalyphas, Hibiscus, Travellers palms, Aloes). A substantial amount of this landscaping is original.

Centenary Pool is sophisticated in its design conception, and inventive in its sculptural and decorative detailing. The original plantings complement the buildings.

== Heritage listing ==
Centenary Pool Complex was listed on the Queensland Heritage Register on 5 November 1996 having satisfied the following criteria.

The place is important in demonstrating the evolution or pattern of Queensland's history.

The Centenary Pool complex is historically significant as the Brisbane City Council's principal contribution to the Brisbane and Queensland 1959 centenary celebrations. Its construction also reflects the enormous popularity of competitive swimming in Australia following the successful 1956 Melbourne Olympic Games.

The place is important in demonstrating the principal characteristics of a particular class of cultural places.

It demonstrates the details, materials, and construction methods of a sculptural variant of Post-War International style. Nationally, Centenary Pool is a significant example of a 1950s Olympic-standard pool and diving pool complex, and can be ranked in importance with the Melbourne and Canberra Olympic pools.

The place is important because of its aesthetic significance.

It is sophisticated in its design conception, and inventive in its sculptural and decorative detailing. The original plantings complement the buildings.

The place is important in demonstrating a high degree of creative or technical achievement at a particular period.

It is sophisticated in its design conception, and inventive in its sculptural and decorative detailing. The original plantings complement the buildings.

The place has a strong or special association with a particular community or cultural group for social, cultural or spiritual reasons.

Its social significance lies in its contribution to the development of competitive swimming in Brisbane, having been the city's principal aquatic sports centre from 1959 to 1980.

The place has a special association with the life or work of a particular person, group or organisation of importance in Queensland's history.

The complex is important as one of the major civic works designed by prominent Queensland architect James Birrell.

== 2032 Olympic Swimming Venue ==
National Aquatic Centre
- Interactive map of National Aquatic Centre
- Location: Victoria Park, Brisbane, Queensland, Australia
- Capacity: 25,000 (Games-time); 8,000 (post-Games)

Construction
- Opened: 2031/2032 (expected)
- Architects: Arkhefield, ARM Architecture, NH Architecture

The Centenary Pool Complex will receive an upgrade in the lead up to the 2032 Summer Olympics.

The upgrades will include three new pools, two of them indoors (50m and 65m in length) which will be used for various aquatic sports. Other additions include an indoor dive tower, a new outdoor pool, a 27m outdoor tower for diving and high diving, as well as seating holding 8,800 attendees, capable of 25,000 during the Games.

The upgrades were announced as part of the 2032 Delivery Plan announced on 25 March 2025 by the Crisafulli government. The plan also includes venues such as a 63,000-seat stadium at Victoria Park and upgraded Brisbane Showgrounds capable of hosting 20,000 seated spectators.

On 23 July 2026, the Games Independent Infrastructure and Coordination Authority (GIICA) revealed design concepts for the new National Aquatic Centre, and announced the architects for the venue; Arkhefield, ARM Architecture and NH Architecture.
