= James Birrell =

Australian architect (1928–2019)

James Peter Birrell
- Born: 24 October 1928; Melbourne, Australia
- Died: 20 September 2019 (aged 90)
- Occupation: Architect
- Awards: 2005 RAIA Gold Medal
- Buildings: Union College, University of Queensland James Purnell Building – University of Queensland, JD Story Administration Building – University of Queensland, Agriculture and Entomology Building (Hartley Teakle Building) – University of Queensland
- Projects: Brisbane Centenary Pool Centre

James Birrell (1928–2019) was an architect responsible for the design of significant buildings in Queensland, Australia. James Birrell practiced from 1951 to 1986.

== Personal life ==
James Peter Birrell was born in Melbourne on the 24 October 1928, the eldest child of Harry and Elizabeth Birrell. Growing up in Essendon North, Birrell attended North Essendon Primary School from 1934 to 1940 and Essendon State High School from 1940 to 1944.

In 1945, at the age of 17, James Birrell was accepted into the Melbourne Technical College as an architecture student. To help finance his studies, Birrell worked part-time as a builder's labourer. In 1947, Birrell began work as a draughtsman for the Victorian State Works Department and continued his studies Part-time. The same year he also became involved in the Contemporary Arts Society, through the Society he gained many new friends, notably Peter Burns.

In 1950 Birrell was accepted into Fourth Year Architecture at the University of Melbourne. In 1951 he graduated and designed his first houses, in Frankston and Warrandyte, Birrell also worked briefly as the resident Architect at the Commonwealth Serum Laboratories.

In 1952 Birrell co-founded the magazine Architecture and Arts with his contemporaries, Peter Burns, Helen O'Donnell and Norman Lehey. In 1954 Birrell contributed to the Contemporary Arts Society's exhibition 'Space Modulators' along with artists including Sidney Nolan, Ian Fairweather, Charles Blackman, Arthur Boyd and John Perceval.

Working for the Commonwealth Works Department, Birrell was transferred to Canberra, before going on to Darwin and finally Brisbane. In Brisbane James Birrell went on to become Brisbane City Council Architect and University of Queensland Staff Architect. It was during this period that Birrell designed his most significant buildings.

Throughout his life Birrell admired the works of Walter Burley Griffin and in 1964 he wrote a biography on Griffin.

In March 1985 James Birrell was elected as a councillor for the Shire of Maroochy in Queensland.

Birrell's archive is held at the Fryer Library at the University of Queensland and the State Library of Queensland.

Birrell died 20 September 2019.

== Notable projects ==
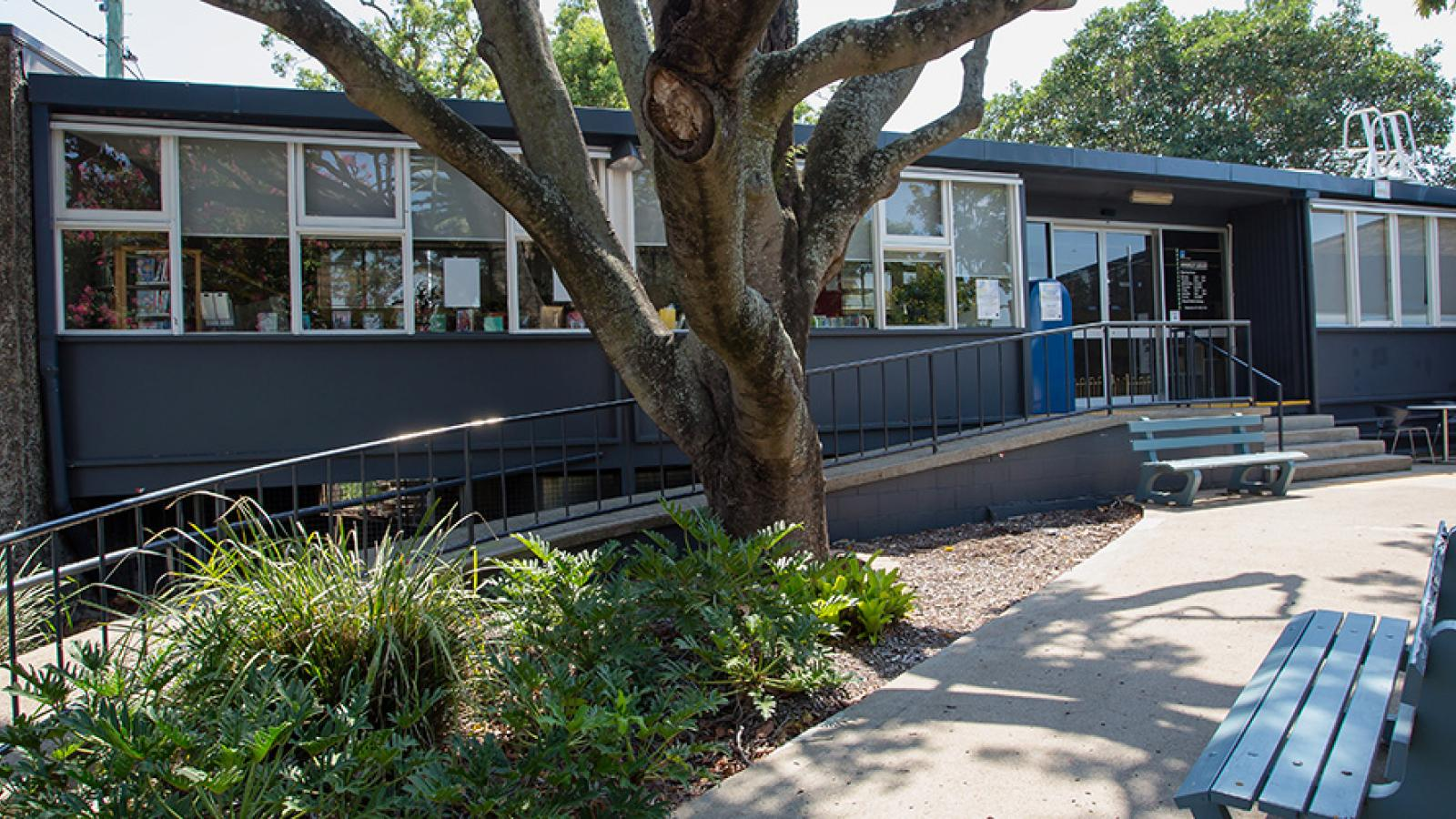
Annerley Library, 2016

Brisbane City Council Architect

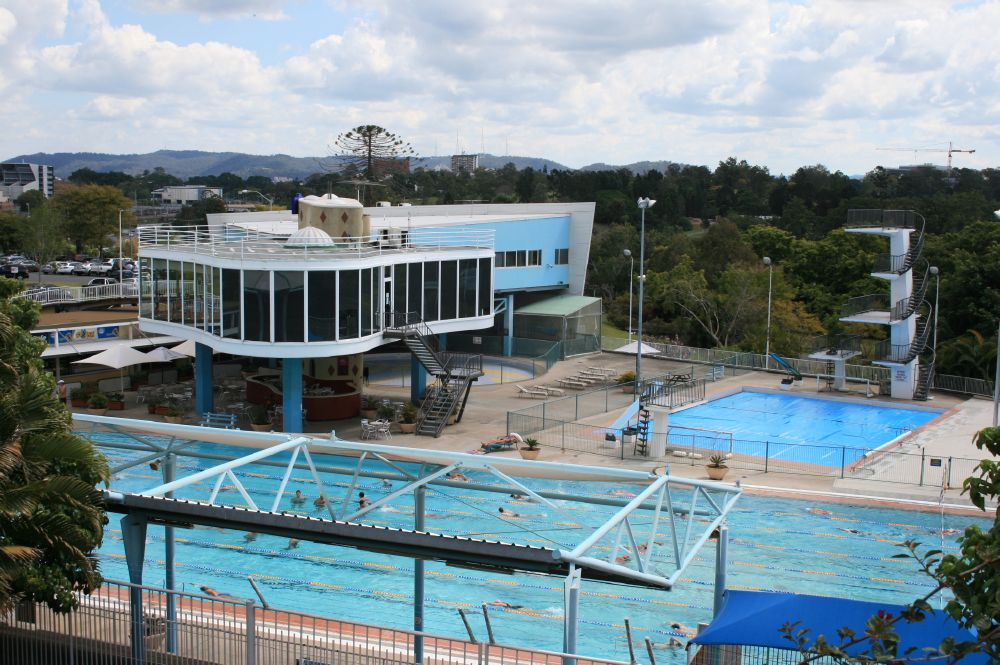
Centenary Pool Complex, 2008

In 1956 as Brisbane City Council Architect Birrell designed the Chermside and Annerley Libraries, Centenary Pool Complex at Spring Hill as well as numerous public amenities. In 1957 his design proposal for the Centenary Pool complex was successful with construction finishing in 1959. Architecture and Arts magazine named the building as one of the top ten buildings within Australia.

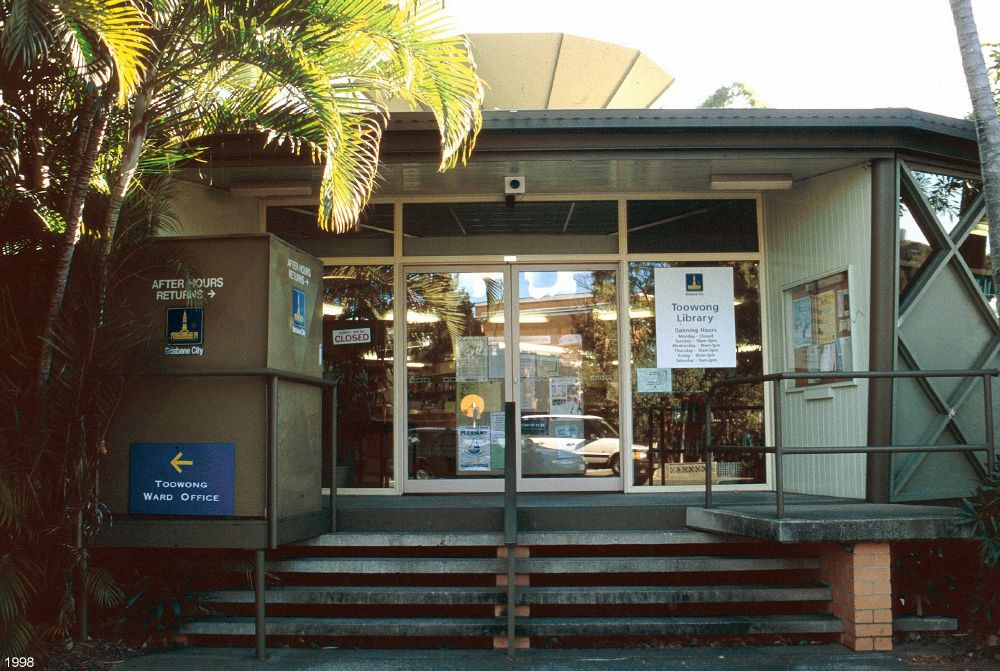
Toowong Municipal Library, 1998

Birrell also designed the former Toowong Municipal Library Building, which was completed in 1961. Located on Coronation Drive, it was directly opposite to Birrell's Toowong Pool (which has since been demolished). The library is heritage listed although it is now used for commercial purposes (medical imaging-MRI in 2015).

University of Queensland Staff Architect

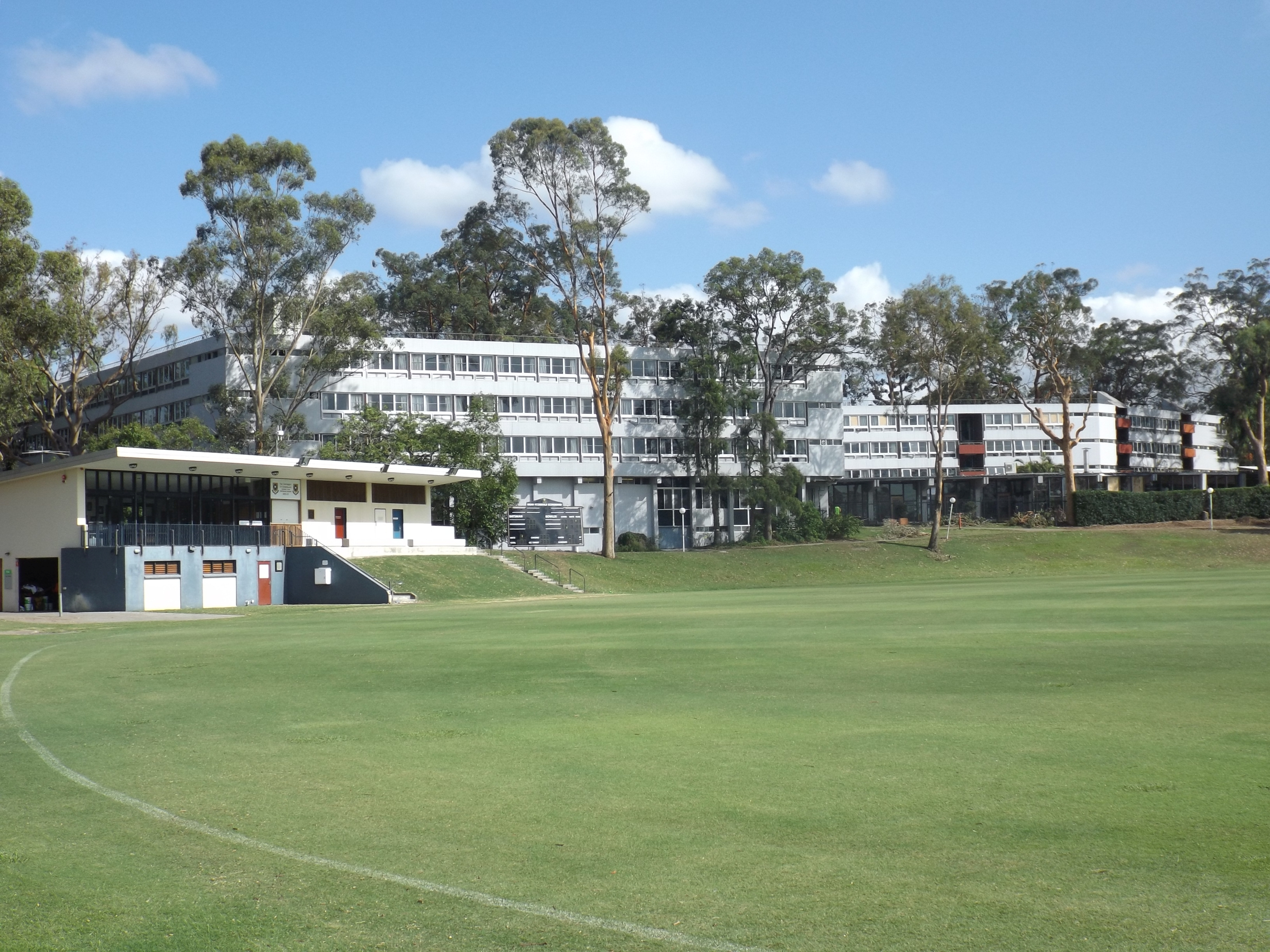
Union College, 2014

From 1961 to 1966 James Birrell practiced as The University of Queensland Staff Architect. In this position he designed and documented Union College, which was constructed in five stages from 1964 and 1972. Union College was highly commended after its construction. It was visually pleasing while also being innovative in terms of the structure and its response to pre-existing site conditions. Union College received a High Commendation award from Arts and Architecture journal as one of the best ten new buildings in Australia at the time.

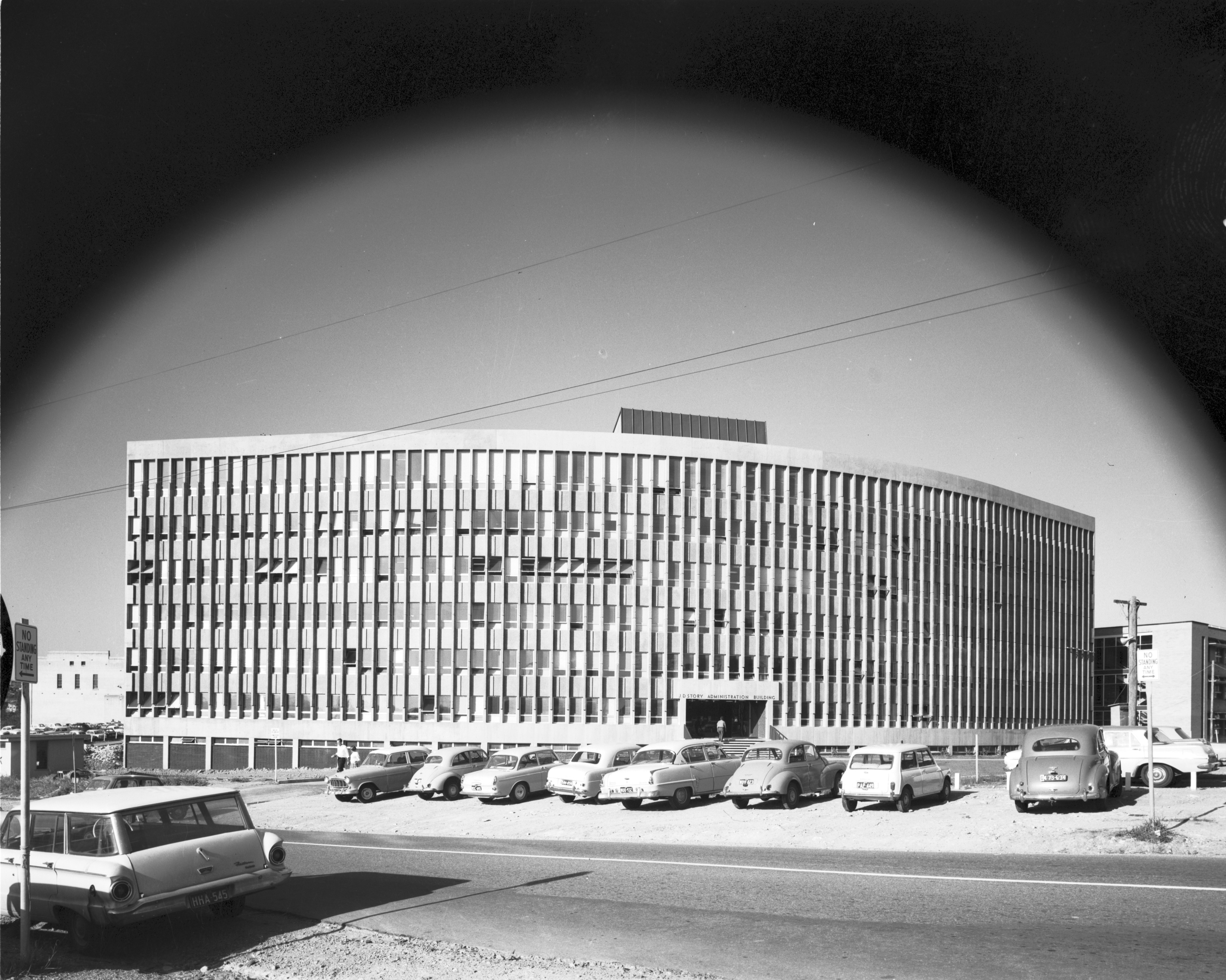
J D Story Administration Building, University of Queensland, St Lucia, October 1966

During his tenure as staff architect James Birrell was also responsible for the JD Story Administration Building (1965) and the Agriculture and Entomology Building, now known as the Hartley Teakle Building (1966). Birrell was also responsible for the design of the campus plan at James Cook University in Townsville, and several of its early buildings 1964–1970. In 1965 Birrell became President of the Australian Planning Institute.

Private Practice

In 1966 he moved into private practice. Much of Birrell's work in this period came from overseas. He worked for the University of Papua New Guinea, where he designed the Halls of Residence, Arts/Law and Arts II Buildings, and in Indonesia as a government planning consultant.

== Works ==
- Toowong Municipal Library and Pool designed while City Council Architect.
- Union College Building designed while University of Queensland Staff.
- Wickham Terrace Car Park
- Private residence - 4 Carol Court, Buderim, Qld
- Nambour Council Building / Shire Chambers, Library and town square
- Brisbane Centenary Pool Centre
- Annerley Library, Brisbane
- University Hall of Residence, James Cook University
- Eddie Koiki Mabo Library, James Cook University
- Ken Back Chancellory Building, James Cook University
- JD Story Administration Building – University of Queensland
- Agriculture and Entomology Building (Hartley Teakle Building) – University of Queensland
- Papua New Guinea Banking Corporation (PNGBC) (now Bank South Pacific), headquarters – Port Moresby, Papua New Guinea
- Agriculture Bank – Port Moresby, Papua New Guinea
- University of Queensland Staff and Graduates Club

== Awards ==
- Union College, University of Queensland, RAIA High Commendation (1966)
- JD Story Administration Building, University of Queensland, RAIA Commendation
- Agriculture and Entomology Building (Hartley Teakle Building), University of Queensland, RAIA Citation (1970)

In 2005 Birrell was awarded the RAIA Gold Medal. Royal Australian Institute of Architects national president Warren Kerr said the Melbourne-born Brisbane-based architect had made a "spirited and distinguished contribution to the discipline of architecture".

== Tributes ==
- The University of Queensland Staff and Graduates Club have a room named the "James Birrell Room".
- Architecture students in the University of Queensland's Faculty of Engineering, Architecture and Information Technology's Scholars program are known as Birrell Scholars. The program provides the Faculty's top students with enhanced academic, industry and cultural experiences.
