= Forgan Smith Building =

Building at the University of Queensland, Brisbane, Australia

Coordinates: 27.4969°S 153.0130°E

The Forgan Smith Building is the centrepiece of the Great Court structure in the main campus of the University of Queensland in Brisbane, Australia.

== History ==
The construction of the building began in 1937, and it was finished in the early 1950s. Its construction was started as an economic stimulus project by the Premier of Queensland, William Forgan Smith, during the Great Depression. It now carries Forgan Smith's name.

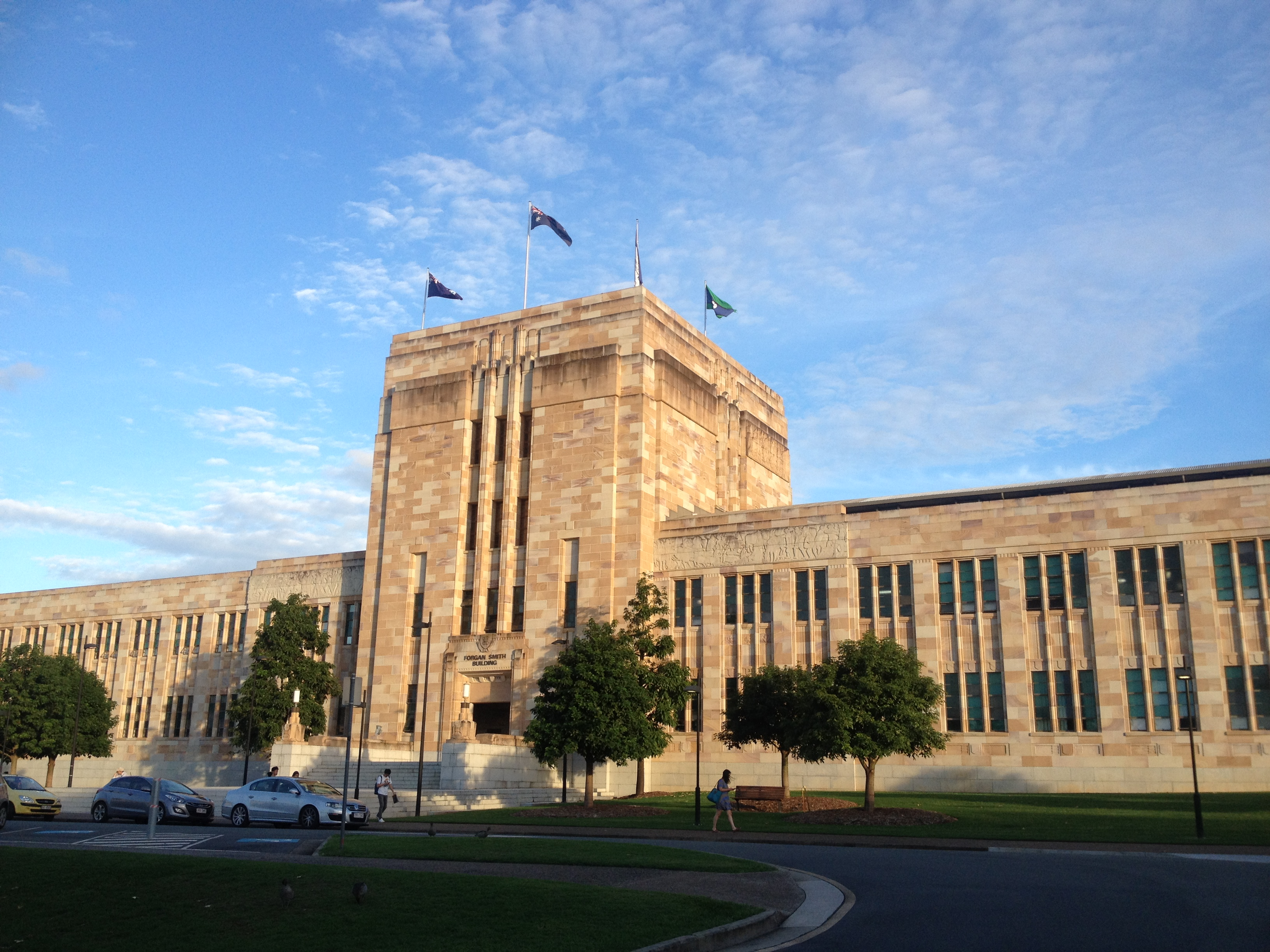
The Forgan Smith Building.

== Description ==
The building is 299 m (981 ft) long, with a 22.7 m (74 ft) central tower, with an Arts wing to its east, and a Law wing to its west, and a library and a great hall in both ends. The style of the building is described as "inter-war stripped classical style", as well as Art Deco.
