= Toowong Municipal Library Building =

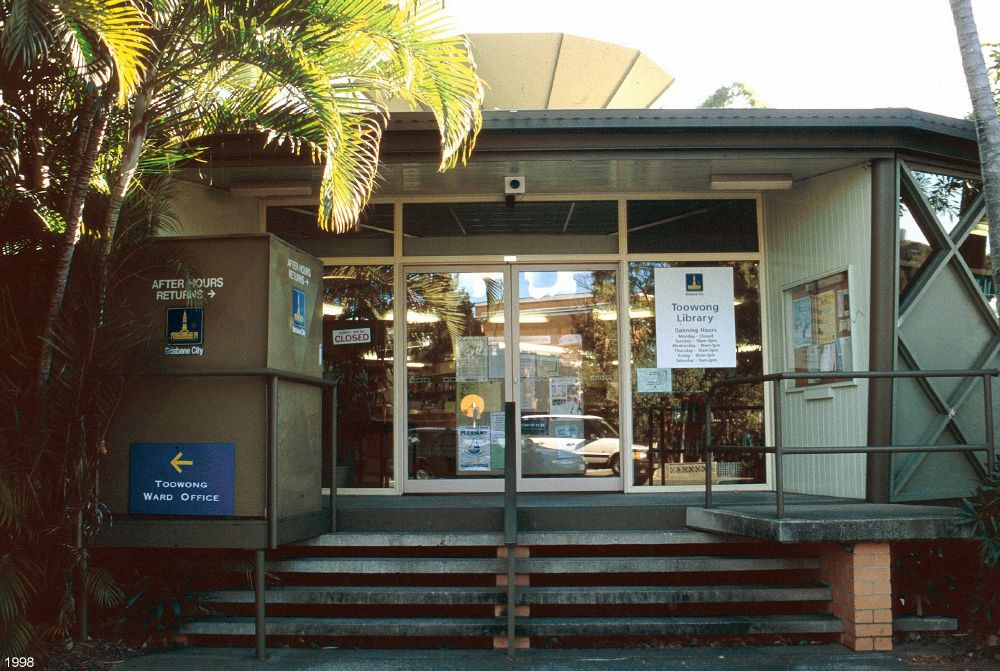
- Former Toowong Municipal Library Building, 1998

- Location within Queensland Location within Australia
- 27.4835°S 152.995°E
- Location: 579–583 Coronation Drive, Toowong, Brisbane, Queensland, Australia

History
- Design period: 1940s–1960s (post-World War II)
- Built: 1961

Site notes
- Architect: James Birrell
- Architectural style: Modernism

Queensland Heritage Register
- Official name: Toowong Municipal Library (former)
- Type: state heritage (landscape, built)
- Designated: 28 August 1998
- Reference no.: 602011
- Significant period: 1960s (historical); 1960s (fabric); 1960s–1990s (social)
- Significant components: library – building, garden/grounds
- Builders: Stuart Brothers

The Toowong Municipal Library Building is heritage-listed former public library at 579–583 Coronation Drive, Toowong, City of Brisbane, Queensland, Australia. It was designed by James Birrell and built in 1961 by Stuart Brothers. It was added to the Queensland Heritage Register on 28 August 1998. In 2001, the library moved to Toowong Village Shopping Centre and the original building has been used as business premises.

== History ==
The former Toowong Municipal Library is prominently located on Coronation Drive and was opened in April 1961, built to the design of Chief Architect at the Brisbane City Council, James Birrell. It provides evidence of the City Council's expansion of public facilities in the post war period.

Following World War II, when shortage of both labour and materials restricted building work to essentials, the Brisbane City Council embarked on a capital works programme which provided the city with a substantial number of upgraded and new recreational and educational facilities. During the period from 1945 to the early 1960s about ten libraries were constructed and two renovated and redevelopment and construction occurred at five major pool complexes. From the period 1955 until 1960, when most of this vast programme was realised, the Chief Architect with the Brisbane City Council was James Birrell. He was responsible for the design of about 150 sites ranging from his two major projects – the Centenary Pool Complex and the Wickham Terrace Car Park to a number of bus shelters, park entrances, public toilets, cemeteries, sewerage depots and a bus depot. Included in his work of this time was the redevelopment of the Toowong Baths and the construction of a major municipal library at Toowong.

Birrell graduated from architecture at the University of Melbourne in 1951, where he was much influenced by one of his teachers, Melbourne architect Roy Grounds. It was Grounds' use of strong primary forms which influenced Birrell's early work, including that work for the Brisbane City Council. Like Grounds, Birrell used highly identifiable forms sited in landscapes which, apart from a reality associated with their function have an abstract reality or quality which relies solely on their form and siting. The Toowong Library characterises this aspect of his work.

The library is a twelve-sided figure where the geometry is made more insistent by the walls sloping outward with diagonal external framing. The derivation of the library's form can be explained by book-shelving arrangements and its ring-beam construction, but if it has any meaning in itself this is in having the appearance of a flying-saucer and being easily identifiable at 300 metres (980 ft) on a busy road.

In 1952, Birrell expressed aspects of his architectural philosophy in the Melbourne journal Architecture and the Arts, with which he was much involved. These ideas are manifest in many of his Queensland buildings, including those constructed for the Brisbane City Council. This philosophy described the primacy of material and structural integrity, advocating a new engineering dynamism imbued by the materials, technical knowledge and industrial procedures of contemporary culture. This is certainly one of the enduring forces in his work. Following World War II rapid progress was made in the technology of building materials, particularly in the Brisbane steelworks industry. The new and developed materials and products which Birrell used frequently include acrylics and plastics; concrete screen blocks; and timber based boards significantly plywood. Using expertise gained during the war years, Evans Deakin, local ship builders were instrumental in solving complex geometrics in steel work often required on the projects of Birrell.

Of the work James Birrell designed for the Brisbane City Council, very few buildings remain substantially unaltered. Several toilet blocks survive – at Nundah Cemetery, Victoria Park, Mount Coot-tha; two libraries at Annerley and Chermside survive although both have been substantially altered; an entrance feature at Albert Park survives; several buildings in the Abbotsford Road Workshops and the Ann Street Bus Depot survive; two buildings at the Wynnum Civic Centre survive although they have been dramatically altered; buildings survive at the Pinnaroo Lawn Cemetery although later unsympathetic buildings significantly alter the original context; a number of pool complexes survive although many of these have been redeveloped; an electrical substation at Stafford survives and the much altered Centenary Pool and Wickham Terrace Carpark. Many of Birrell's council projects were illustrated in national design journals including the Chermside, Annerley and Toowong municipal libraries, the Stafford substation; the Langlands Park pool complex and the Toowong Baths redevelopment; toilets at Mt Coot-tha; Centenary Pool, Wickham Terrace Carpark and a works depot at Mt Gravatt.

Following his years at the Brisbane City Council, Birrell moved on to firstly, the University of Queensland and after to the James Cook University where he was involved in master planning the site, and, from there, to Papua New Guinea where he designed many substantial buildings, before returning to private practice in Australia. The work of James Birrell, particularly during his time at the Brisbane City Council and after, as the architect to the University of Queensland is widely held to be influential, innovative and excellent.

The Toowong Municipal Library was opened in April 1961 as the largest suburban library in Brisbane and designed to service the western suburbs. The design of the timber, glass and steel framed building, a twelve sided externally framed form floating on an organic brick base, was controversial and received much attention when completed.

The library was constructed on three allotments which were part of a New South Wales Land Purchase by Robert Towns and George Christie. The site was also part of the 1889 Moore subdivision of this area of land and changed hands a number of times before one of the lots was acquired by the Toowong Town Council on 1 September 1903. This lot remained in the Council's use as a storage facility until the decision to build the library was made in 1959. At this time the two other allotments, closer to Booth Street were also acquired. Houses had been constructed on these blocks and these were demolished to accommodate the library.

The provision of libraries by municipal councils in Queensland is a relatively new phenomena, with most libraries currently operating established since the late 1940s. Previously, Schools of Arts and privately owned Reading Rooms provided a similar service and these were often run by local committees and subsidised by local councils. Local councils were granted authority in the Local Government Act 1878 to establish and operate libraries, although this was very uncommon until the twentieth century. The first publicly funded municipal library was opened in Kurilpa (West End) in 1929 and a similar library was operating in South Brisbane soon after. Local councils became seriously involved in the construction of libraries in Queensland after the Libraries Act 1943 was passed which provided for the establishment of a State Library Board which was to provide for the improvement of library services throughout the state. By 1950 seven libraries were operating throughout Brisbane and by April 1961 when Toowong Library was opened the Council was operating twelve libraries.

Prior to the construction of the Toowong Library, James Birrell designed two other libraries for the Council at Chermside (1957–8) and Annerley (1956–7). The design of these buildings, although modern, were more conventional than the design of the Toowong Library. In 2014 the Annerley Library (with substantial additions) still operates as a municipal library. The much altered Chermside Library was sold in November 1997.

Discussions concerning the provision of a municipal library at Toowong started in 1956 when the Council set aside £4000 for the construction of a district library to service the western suburbs of Brisbane. Over the next few years several properties near the Toowong railway station were investigated as potential library sites. It was not until March 1959 that firm plans were made to use the Council storage facility at the end of Coronation Drive. Alderman Ord, the local councillor, announced to the press in March 1959 that "a library of brick, glass and steel would be the biggest municipal library in the suburbs and the first in the western suburbs. It would serve the people of St Lucia, Indooroopilly, Toowong, Auchenflower, Taringa, Brookfield and Kenmore". Ord went on to say that the library would form a civic block with the recently redeveloped Toowong Baths site.

The design of the Toowong Library was innovative and controversial. From the earliest reports of the unusual 12 sided library in 1959, the press covered the story of the planning and growing controversy over the design of the building. The City Librarian lodged a formal complaint over the design of the building with the City Council's Manager of Planning and Building, detailing criticism of the shape, internal layout and lack of consultation with librarians through the design process. In reply to this James Birrell prepared a memorandum addressing the complaints:

"The City Librarian has criticised the circular shape of the building, stating that most library authorities favour the more conventional rectangular or square buildings as being more economical of shelf space...his opinion is correct that square buildings have more perimeter than round buildings. However shelf space is not the only criterion upon which the circular plans have been adopted...a circular building form is the most economical for the structural enclosure of a large open space and results in functional arrangements for the provision of natural light and ventilation and circulation within the reading room...Criticisms have been levelled at libraries of all shapes and sizes. Each should be treated on its own merits."

Criticism continued until the opening of the building on 13 April 1961 and it is thought that the reason the project was realised substantially unaltered from the first plans of 1959 and amid the controversy was that the Lord Mayor, Alderman Reg Groom and local councillor, Alderman Ord's interest in, and fostering of, modern architecture. An article in The Courier-Mail quoting Alderman Ord suggested that the controversy surrounding the building was a sign of vigour in the local architecture scene.

The building was constructed for about £26,000 by local contractors Stuart Brothers, using innovative construction techniques and materials, with the design involvement of the Engineering Branch of the Council's Department of Works. Many architectural and building journals featured the building following its opening. As early as August 1959 a photograph of a model of the library appeared in Cross-section. In December 1961 an article about the library with photographs appeared in the RAIA journal, Architecture in Australia.

New materials used on the library were detailed in the May/June 1961 issue of Building Materials, which featured the building. Such materials included Rotary Red Cedar Exterior plywood panelling, also featured in the Plywood and Plywood Products journal of September 1961. The roof membrane of the library was formed with 2-inch (51 mm) thick laminated fibre board clad with bituminous felt and finished with white grain render and a copper fascia. When completed, the centre point of the roof of the building was finished with an amber acrylic light dome, apparently the largest acrylic dome produced in Australia at the time. Machinery connected to the upper most level of glazing surrounding the building allowed the windows to be mechanically opened. Installed in the ceiling of the library were two concentric light troughs formed with fluorescent tubes between purlins concealed with a translucent acrylic sheeting, operating in much the same way internal lighting operates with most current suspended ceiling systems. As well there were a number of suspended lighting features of circular fluorescent tubes fixed together on a light framework.

The careful placement of the Toowong Library on its site, likened to the work of Birrell's great and abiding influence, Walter Burley Griffin, allows it to be viewed from the street as a one storeyed structure floating amid surrounding vegetation. The rear of the building reveals its true two storeyed nature, but even this view reinforces its floating quality, as the base is an organic form of dark face brick. The skilful manipulation of the site allowed the original entrance to the base and to the library level to remain segregated. The considered landscape design by the Brisbane City Council's parks section includes the use of succulents, rocks and palms and is credited to the talented landscape architect, Harry Oakman.

During the 1960s, following Birrell's' departure from the Council, alterations were made to the library including the replacement of the light troughs and suspended lighting features. The library was threatened for closure in 1982 following the opening of a new municipal library at Indooroopilly in 1981. The Toowong Library did in fact close but local residents' action saw it re-opened in 1983. Alterations were made to the building in 1983 when one of the rooms on the lower floor was acquired for use by the local councillor as a ward office. This room which was originally planned as an auditorium was used by the library as a workroom and to accommodate the councillor was partitioned to form a reception, office and storage space.

By 2001 the building had been painted externally and the amber plastic roof dome was replaced with a large funnel shaped object concealing an air conditioning plant. The interior of the building remains substantially intact with original unpainted internal timberwork, glazed brickwork on the lower floor and original furniture and fittings including the counter, some perimeter shelving and other shelving units. The building ceased operating as the Toowong Library in 2001 and is privately owned.

== Description ==
The former Toowong Municipal Library is located on the western side of Coronation Drive in Toowong. The library site comprises a two storeyed building sited amid dense vegetation on a corner site, with open air car parking facilities off Booth Street and a terraced area with seating and a playground.

The library comprises a cavity brick lower floor, the plan of which is formed by three intersecting circles. Above this base floor is a "floating" crystalline form with 12 sided polygon (dodecagon) floor plan whose external walls taper outward as they rise and which houses the principal public floor of the library. The external steel wall framing of the upper floor is diagonally crossed, or braced, and sheeted with plywood panels set within the structural framing and framed with silky oak beading. The upper two rows of steel framing are infilled with glazed panels, the top level of which are operable windows.

The first floor is a suspended reinforced concrete slab spanning from the brick base of the building to an outer steel channel welded to twelve 6-inch (150 mm) diameter steel columns, coincident with the twelve edges of the building. The roof, supported on RSJ purlins is pitched upward toward the centre of the building where a large, recently constructed, funnel shaped form houses an air conditioning plant. The roof has been clad with metal decking.

The principal entrance to the library floor is via wide concrete steps extending along one of the sides to the east of the building, off Coronation Drive. The entrance comprises a recessed portico from which electronic glass doors give access to the library. Access is provided to the lower floor from a doorway in the rear of the building and via an internal stair. The lower floor of the building is of glazed face brick and contains a number of irregularly but well proportioned timber framed window openings and small concrete panels reflecting the placement and layout of the internal stair.

The internal layout of the library floor is essentially open plan, with part-height partitions allowing space to continue beyond room divisions. Central on the floor is a large symmetrically arranged, circular counter and workspace area. The curved counter is lined on the front face with vertical strip timber boarding and this also lines the partitioning on this floor which form the workspace and office beyond the counter. The workspace is a circular semi open room adjacent to the counter. This floor plan of this space is reflected on the lower ground floor as one of the intersecting circles forming the floor plan. On the western side of the workspace is a small office which is formed with 1/2 glazed full height partitioning screens, maintaining the feeling of space in confined areas. Between the workspace and the office is a spiralling cantilevered concrete stair. The interior of the lower floor of the library has a concrete floor and glazed brick walls. Built along the walls of the major work area are original timber cupboards, shelving and counter units. Within a small pod to the north of this workspace is a toilet and bathroom. The other large space on the lower floor accessed via a door at the west of the building houses a reception area, office, and bathroom and storage facilities.

== Heritage listing ==
The former Toowong Municipal Library Building was listed on the Queensland Heritage Register on 28 August 1998 having satisfied the following criteria.

The place is important in demonstrating the evolution or pattern of Queensland's history.

Toowong Municipal Library is important in demonstrating the provision and upgrading of public facilities by the Brisbane City Council in the post war years. The Toowong Municipal Library, opened in 1961 as a district library for the western suburbs of Brisbane, demonstrates the accelerated provision of municipal public libraries following the introduction of the Libraries Act 1943 and the consequent establishment of a State Library Board.

The place demonstrates rare, uncommon or endangered aspects of Queensland's cultural heritage.

The library is a rare surviving and substantially intact example of the architecture and planning of James Birrell. Birrell is an architect of national stature and repute and the place is significant as evidence of Birrell's thought and practice. Birrell was Chief Architect of the Brisbane City Council in the period from 1955 to 1960. James Birrell was responsible for the design of more than 150 projects during his six years as the Chief Architect, of these projects only a few survive intact.

The place is important in demonstrating the principal characteristics of a particular class of cultural places.

It is a good representative example of one of the most important schools of thought on architecture in Australia in the post war period; that of the Melbourne School of Roy Grounds and Robin Boyd.

The place is important because of its aesthetic significance.

The library has aesthetic and architectural significance as a civic landmark designed, in conjunction with the Toowong Pool, to herald the suburb of Toowong and the western suburbs beyond. The place is a fine example of Birrell's considered approach to siting strong forms within landscapes. The scale, texture, mass, proportions, juxtaposition of elements and siting has produced a fine, well composed building of significant architectural quality. The Toowong Library is an exceptionally fine architectural accomplishment and one of the finest examples of post war architecture in the state.

The place is important in demonstrating a high degree of creative or technical achievement at a particular period.

As well the building demonstrate Birrell's preoccupation with structural integrity and his use of innovative building materials and techniques which reflected the culture of the time. This was particularly apparent in post war society when many new and innovative building materials and techniques were developed using expertise gained in various industries during the war years.

The building was designed to incorporate many innovative building techniques and products and are creative works of the period. The project received considerable attention in national building and architecture journals.

The place has a strong or special association with a particular community or cultural group for social, cultural or spiritual reasons.

The building has social significance and has strong associations with the Toowong and wider Brisbane community as an important public facility of considerable usage and prominence.

The place has a special association with the life or work of a particular person, group or organisation of importance in Queensland's history.

The building has strong associations with the architect, James Birrell, as a fine examples of his prolific and influential Council work.
