= Harry Oakman =

Australian horticulturalist and writer

- Born: 4 April 1906; Lommel, Limburg, Belgium
- Died: 16 June 2002 (aged 96); Moggill, Brisbane, Queensland, Australia

Henry Octave Cyril Vereecke (4 April 1906 – 16 June 2002), better known as Harry Oakman, was one of Australia's foremost gardening authorities and a pioneer of Australian architectural landscaping. An immigrant from Belgium, Oakman wrote numerous illustrated books on gardening and, as a public landscaper, enjoyed enormous influence over the design of open spaces in Brisbane, Canberra, and Newcastle.

== Early life ==
Oakman was born in Lommel, in the province of Limburg, Belgium on 4 April 1906. His mother died when he was two years old, and his father took him to England during World War I, then to Australia in 1920. After moving to Australia, young Henry changed his name to Harry Oakman. Oakman first worked on farms in rural New South Wales, then at the age of 17 moved to Pennant Hills, in North Sydney, where he worked in flower nurseries. After a few years he began to look after local parks for the Ku-ring-gai Council. On 12 December 1938 Oakman married May Addison Clark, and they lived together happily until her death on 11 April 1990.

From 1940 until 1945, Oakman worked on parks in Newcastle, before being appointed Superintendent of Parks in Brisbane. Over a period of 17 years (1946–1962), Oakman transformed the parklands of Brisbane, built 120 playing fields, and assisted in designing and producing two botanic gardens, as well as Queens Park, Townsville. During his time as manager of Brisbane Parks, he was responsible for extensive tree planting programs across the city and for the design and revitatization of many parks, including the Brisbane Botanical Gardens and New Farm Park. He was also involved in the foreshore upgrade and improvements along Brisbane's bayside beaches, the construction of the Victoria Park Golf Course, Lang Park sports field and running track, the Aspley and Hemmant cemeteries; the landscaping of Newstead Gardens and many other suburban and city parks.

He left Brisbane to work for the National Capital Development Commission in Canberra, where he was largely responsible for the landscape of Woden Valley, Belconnen and the area around Lake Burley Griffin. He also assisted in the development of Commonwealth Park.

In 1972, Oakman retired, and lived out the remainder of his long life in Brisbane. Over his life he published a number of books, variously reported as three, nine, or thirteen, but always regarded as highly influential within the Australian gardening community. His 1975 book, Tropical and Subtropical Gardening, is one of the most important works on gardening in Queensland. He was a Fellow of the British and Australian Institutes of Landscape Architects and the Royal Australian Institute of Parks and Recreation. Oakman's own garden, which covered a one hectare block, was well known as being colourful all year 'round, despite receiving little watering. Oakman died in Moggill, in West Brisbane on 16 June 2002, at the age of 96. His papers were donated to the University of Queensland Fryer Library in 1995.
