= John Francis (Jack) Hennessy =

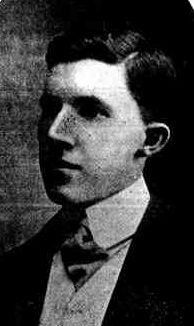
- John Francis (Jack) Hennessy in 1910
- Born: John Francis Hennessy; 8 January 1887; Burwood, Sydney, New South Wales
- Died: 4 September 1955 (aged 68); Sydney
- Resting place: Rookwood Cemetery
- Education: Sydney Technical College; University of Pennsylvania
- Occupation: Architect
- Years active: 1912 – c. 1940s
- Father: John Francis Hennessy
- Practice: Hennessy & Hennessy; Hennessy, Hennessy & Co.
- Buildings: Great Court, University of Queensland
- Design: Holy Name Cathedral, Brisbane

John Francis (Jack) Hennessy (1887–1955) was an Australian architect, with the same name as his architect father, John Francis Hennessy, with whom he was in partnership as Hennessy & Hennessy from 1912 to 1924. As principal of the firm after his father retired from 1924 to 1955, he was responsible for many major Art Deco office buildings in capital cities in Australia and New Zealand in the 1930s, as well as many projects for the Catholic Church in Queensland, and the Great Court of the University of Queensland.

== Early life ==
Hennessy was born on 8 January 1887 at Burwood, Sydney. After completing his secondary education at the Christian Brothers' High School, Lewisham, and St Patrick's College, Goulburn, he studied architecture at Sydney Technical College and at the University of Pennsylvania. He gained experience with firms in America and Sydney, before becoming a partner with his father, John Francis Hennessy, trading as Hennessy & Hennessy in 1912. John Hennessy retired in 1924, and the firm continued under Jack Hennessy Jnr, retaining the name, though they were also known as Hennessy, Hennessy & Co.

== Career ==
In the 1920s, Queensland Archbishop Duhig commissioned a number of projects for the Catholic Church in Brisbane, including the never-built Holy Name Cathedral, Brisbane. In the 1930s Hennessy designed a series large office buildings for three different insurance firms in three countries, and has been described as Australia's first international architect. Another major project was the Great Court, University of Queensland in St Lucia, Brisbane, built between 1938 and 1979.

In 1950, Hennessy was awarded over £25,000 by the court when he sued to recover his unpaid fees for the Holy Name Cathedral.

Hennessy died of heart disease at his eldest son's home in Sydney on 4 September 1955, at the age of 68. He was buried in the Roman Catholic Cemetery at Rookwood. The firm continued until 1968.

== Major extant works ==
- 1925: Corpus Christi Church in Nundah, Brisbane
- 1927–28: Villa Maria Convent, Fortitude Valley, Brisbane
- 1929: Church of Saint Ignatius Loyola in Toowong, Brisbane
- 1930–31: Colonial Mutual Life, Brisbane
- 1934: Colonial Mutual Life, Adelaide
- 1935: Colonial Mutual Life, Wellington, New Zealand
- 1936: Lawson Apartments, Perth
- 1936: Australian Catholic Assurance, Melbourne
- 1936: Australian Catholic Assurance, Sydney
- 1937: Colonial Mutual Life, Newcastle
- 1937–79: Great Court, University of Queensland, St Lucia, Brisbane
- 1941: Pius XII Provincial Seminary, Banyo, Brisbane.
