= Villa Maria Hostel =

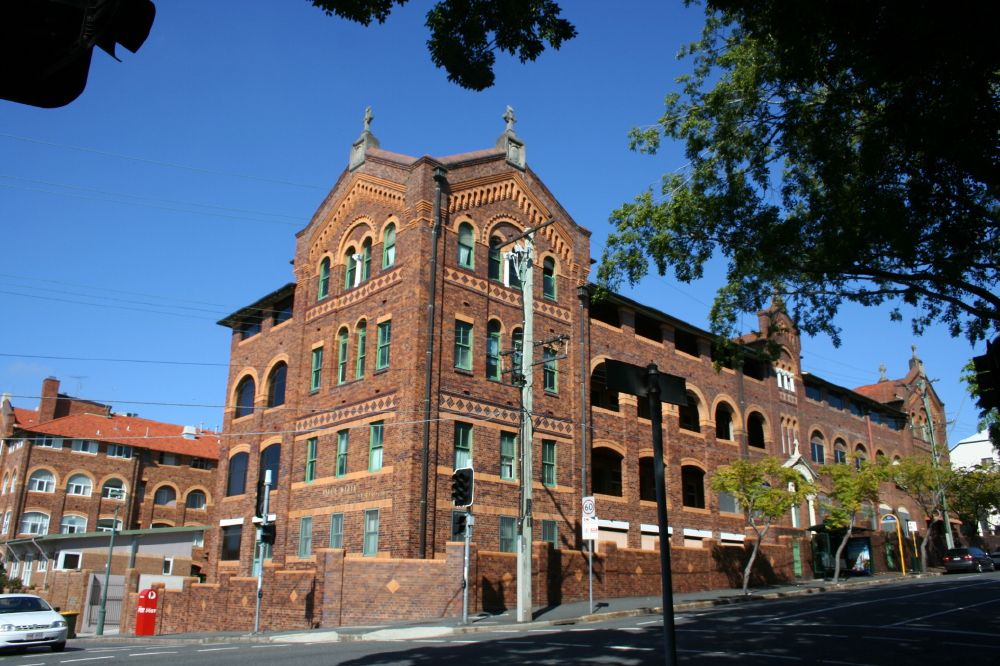
- Villa Maria Hostel, 2008

- Location within Queensland Location within Australia
- 27.4587°S 153.0297°E
- Location: 167–173 Saint Paul's Terrace, Fortitude Valley, City of Brisbane, Queensland, Australia

History
- Design period: 1919–1930s (interwar period)
- Built: 1927–1968

Site notes
- Architect(s): Frank Cullen, Hennessy and Hennessy, Keesing & Co, & J P Donoghue
- Architectural style: Romanesque

Queensland Heritage Register
- Official name: Villa Maria Hostel
- Type: state heritage (built)
- Designated: 18 September 2008
- Reference no.: 601929
- Significant period: 1920–1950
- Significant components: courtyard, statue, verandahs – arcaded, views to, room/unit/suite, cloister/s, views from, lead light/s, chapel, gate/s, fence/wall – perimeter

Villa Maria Hostel is a heritage-listed nursing home at 167–173 Saint Paul's Terrace, Fortitude Valley, City of Brisbane, Queensland, Australia. It was designed by Frank Cullen, Hennessy, Hennessy, Keesing & Co, & J P Donoghue and built from 1927 to 1968. It was added to the Queensland Heritage Register on 18 September 2008.

== History ==
The Villa Maria Centre is a large complex occupying most of the block bounded by Gotha Street, St Paul's Terrace, Warren Street and Barry Parade. Villa Maria was established by the Sisters of Perpetual Adoration of the Blessed Sacrament, a religious order which has cared for the poor, aged and needy in Queensland since 1874. The Villa Maria Hostel, the subject of this assessment, comprises about two-thirds of the Villa Maria Centre as it stands today. It incorporates the original convent and chapel, and was constructed in stages between 1927 and 1968.

Catholic priest, scientist and author Father Julian Tenison Woods, co-founder with Mother Mary MacKillop of the Sisters of St Joseph, established a foundation of Perpetual Adoration in Brisbane in the early 1870s and formed the Sisters of Perpetual Adoration in 1874. A primary objective of the order is the practice of perpetual adoration - there is always one of their number in prayer. Led by Catherine Gaffney (Mother Stanislaus) the first Mother Superior, the first Sisters of Perpetual Adoration (a group of six) rented a house in South Brisbane. They lived extremely frugally, supporting themselves doing needlework, and assisted the poor and needy around them.

In 1881 the Sisters moved to Spring Hill where, in 1900, they purchased two cottages in Leichhardt Street (now St Paul's Terrace) at the corner of Warren Street, now part of the current site of the Villa Maria Centre. They became known in Spring Hill as the Black Sisters because they wore long black dresses and bonnets. Though needlework continued to be their main source of income (they were well known for making priests' vestments and supplying Brisbane emporiums with bridal trousseaus), the Sisters were unable to support themselves solely from needlework and began taking in boarders who paid a weekly rental for the rooms. In 1902 they began caring for elderly ladies. Further houses were acquired and the land used for vegetables, flowers, fowls and a cow. In 1912 the Sisters began making altar breads for the archdiocese of Brisbane.

The largest period of growth for the Institute of Perpetual Adoration took place under the guidance of Archbishop James Duhig. Upon succeeding to the Roman Catholic Archdiocese of Brisbane in 1917, one of Duhig's earliest works was to give formal approval to the work of the Sisters. In 1920, Archbishop James Duhig gave diocesan approbation to the Institute and granted the Sisters their distinctive dress of a black habit and black scapular covered with a white mantle. Up to that time, the Sisters had had no legal security as a religious institute and had worn no strictly religious dress.

James Duhig, Archbishop of Brisbane, took a great interest in the work of the Sisters and encouraged them to build a new facility on their Spring Hill (now Fortitude Valley) site. Villa Maria was also part of Duhig's larger urban design and town planning initiatives, which included the grand scheme for the Holy Name Cathedral. He saw Villa Maria as an integral component of a vision of Brisbane as a city of grand buildings and boulevards, with Leichhardt Street (now St Paul's Terrace) as a tree lined boulevard with tall government buildings and stately mansions on one side and to the other, Victoria Park, plunging into a valley and climbing to the Herston slopes which was to be a future University of Queensland site.

The design of the new building – a convent and hostel – was given to Hennessy, Hennessy, Keesing and Co. and J.P. Donoghue, a Sydney firm of architects (after 1926 known as Hennessy and Hennessy). The firm was commissioned by the archdiocese to design several churches, schools, convents, monasteries, hospitals and charitable institutions. Its work culminated in the proposed scheme for the Holy Name Cathedral. Amongst the other ecclesiastical buildings they designed were St Joseph's Dalby (1921), St Agatha's Clayfield (1925), St Augustine's Coolangatta (1926) and St Ignatius Toowong (1930).

The convent and hostel of Villa Maria was built in four stages – 1927–1928, 1940, 1965 and 1968. On 6 December 1925 Duhig laid the foundation stone of the first stage of the building, comprising the hostel and chapel. The chapel opened in 1927 and the hostel in 1928.

By 1938, the Sisters were ready to build the next stage of the complex and commissioned Brisbane architects, Cullen and Egan, to complete the project. Cullen was a former articled pupil and draftsman at Hennessy, Hennessy and Co. and nephew of Archbishop Duhig. Cullen and Egan prepared the working drawings and supervised the construction of the later stages continuing the original concept of the Hennessy scheme with the same architectural form, expression and detailing with some variation in the internal planning. In 1940 the second section of Villa Maria, the convent wing which included facilities for bread making, ironing and laundry work, was completed. A lift tower was incorporated into the 1928 portion of the building adjacent to the main entrance on Warren Street at the junction of these two stages of the building. In the following year, the basement of the new convent building was converted into dormitories for country girls.

It was not until the early 1960s that plans were prepared to complete the building. In 1963 further cottages were demolished to make way for a new wing along St Paul's Terrace. On 17 July 1965 Archbishop Patrick Mary O'Donnell opened this wing, which provided additional accommodation for 38 women. Built by MJ O'Leary and designed by the architects Frank L Cullen, Fagg, Hargreaves and Mooney, the building cost more than £100,000. The wing was named the St Stanislaus wing in honour of Catherine Gaffney (Mother Stanislaus) the first Mother Superior of the Sisters of Perpetual Adoration.

In 1968 the final stage, St Gabriel's Wing, was constructed. Honouring Mother Mary Gabriel Maloney, Mother-General from 1955 to 1967, the wing ran from Warren Street to Gotha Street along the southeast of the site. Opened on 7 April 1968 by Archbishop O'Donnell, the new wing was designed by architects Frank L Cullen, Fagg, Hargraves and Moony and built by J O'Leary. It provided 48 bedrooms for aged ladies, 22 private rooms for the Sisters, a spacious reception lounge and laundry. With the completion of St Gabriel's Wing, the capacity of the hostel was increased to 134.

In the 1990s further buildings were constructed to the southeast to provide additional care facilities, a new chapel and convent. This part of the complex links with the earlier hostel and chapel by a covered link at ground floor level.

In 2008, the Sisters of Perpetual Adoration continue to care for elderly women and the Villa Maria complex remains the centre of their work in Brisbane. The early convent/hostel building has changed little in external form and expression, however external openings have been glazed with the enclosure of the verandahs. The interior of the building has been extensively altered in the first decade of the 21st century to accommodate contemporary expectations for hostel and aged care facilities. The planning remains largely as designed in the 1920s with double loaded corridors internally accommodating rooms for residents opening onto verandahs and the provision of communal living and workings spaces. The building now accommodates only the hostel/aged care facilities and the convent is housed within the adjacent later buildings. The chapel continues to be used for worship by the residents but not as the chapel for perpetual adoration.

== Description ==
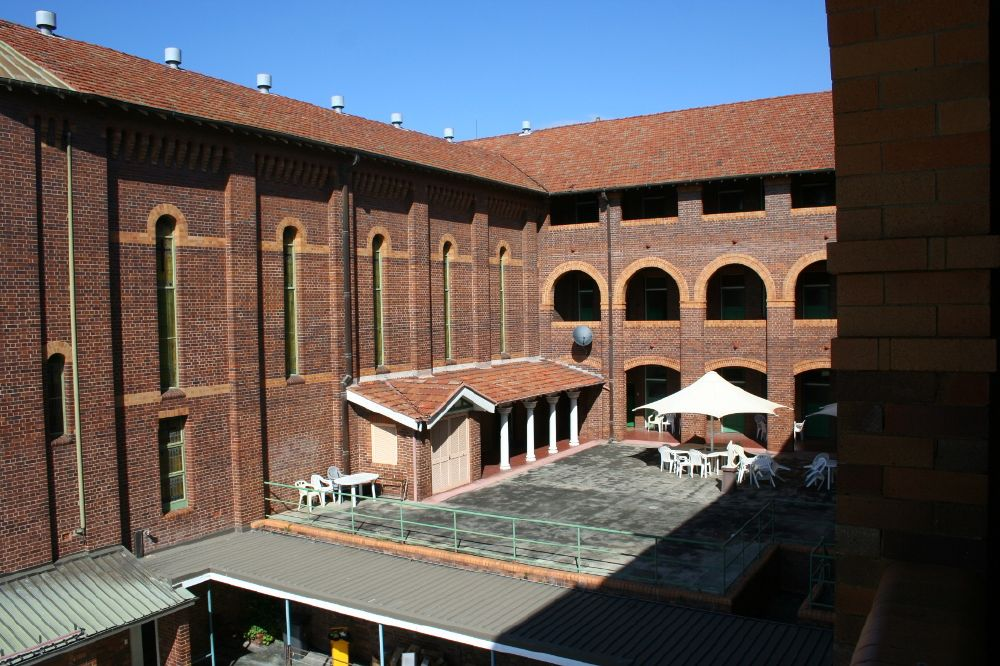
Courtyard, 2008

The heritage listing only includes the E-shaped building constructed between 1927 and 1968 and bounded by Gotha Street, St Paul's Terrace and Warren Street. The later buildings to the southeast of the Villa Maria Centre site are not part of the heritage listing.

Boldly occupying most of the sloping city block bounded by Gotha Street, St Paul's Terrace and Warren Street, Villa Maria convent and hostel dominates the streetscape of St Paul's Terrace, Fortitude Valley. Major alterations to the fabric of the interior have been made to accommodate contemporary expectations for hostel and aged care facilities. The building has changed little in external form and expression, although many of the external openings have been glazed with the enclosure of the verandahs.

The three-, four- and five-storeyed, polychromatic facebrick building designed in a Romanesque idiom, has its principal elevations to St Paul's Terrace and Warren Street. The E-shape building is sheltered by terracotta tiled roofs and Celtic crosses crown all the gable parapets. The massive quality of the exterior is relieved by a regular rhythm of round and flat arches to the verandah openings and characterised by bands of geometric patterning, light coloured brickwork to sills and arches, decorative arcading and scalloped corbelling. The corners of the building are defined by towers with gabled parapets and the north-west and south-east wings are punctuated by narrow central towers incorporating minor entrances. These entrances are defined by short white-painted columns with decorative composite capitals supporting an embellished semi-circular arch. The tower facades are enlivened with decorative arcades to the upper levels.

The former main entrance to the complex is to the centre of the Warren Street frontage which is asymmetrical around a wider central tower than that of the other elevations. This entrance is approached by a set of brick stairs from street level and is sheltered by a projecting, white-painted concrete porch with a vaulted ceiling and a gable roof surmounted by a Celtic cross and supported by four columns with decorative composite capitals. A narrow, square tower rises adjacent to the south-east and is distinguished by the geometric patterning and decorative corbelling characteristic of the building. The entrance to the complex is now in the middle of the southern section of the Warren Street wing.

The ends of the north-west and south-east corner towers and the exterior of the chapel are visible from Gotha Street. The chapel is a three-storey volume characterised by a blind, semi-circular apse and tall narrow arched window openings between flat buttresses to the sides. The fine polychromatic brickwork includes light brick banding defining the arches and bases of the long windows and eaves decorated with corbelling in a machicolation motif.

The earlier stages of the building (Warren Street wing and half the St Paul's Terrace wing) have internal load bearing masonry walls with timber and reinforced concrete floors and the later 1960s wings are of concrete column and beam construction with concrete slabs.

The plan is arranged as a cloister treatment around central courtyards with external verandahs and colonnades, the chapel dividing the cloister into two. The planning remains largely as designed in the 1920s - with double loaded corridors internally accommodating rooms for residents opening onto verandahs and provision of communal living and working spaces in various parts of the building.

The south-east wing and the south half of the Warren Street wing have been refurbished and now accommodate ensuited bedrooms off double loaded corridors. Most original wall, ceiling and floor finishes have been lost, bedrooms enlarged and ensuites added. The special purpose rooms (including the bakery) in the former convent area are replaced with other room configurations. Some of the communal dining/living spaces remain. Verandahs are enclosed or subsumed and most of the verandah openings are now glazed. Verandahs to the south-east wing have been subsumed by the larger bedrooms but retain unglazed verandah openings. Verandahs to Warren Street are subdivided into rooms. At the time of inspection (June 2008), the other wings were being dismantled in preparation for a similar refurbishment.

The former main entrance opens onto an inner porch and then into the vestibule to the chapel. These areas are notable for the fine timber panelled doors surmounted by semi-circular lights or painted tympanum murals, decorative architraves and coloured glass windows matching those in the chapel. Some silky oak and other joinery survives throughout the building including cupboards, windows and doors. South of the chapel, the handsome terrazzo stair with elegant turned timber posts and austere decorative iron balustrading remains.

=== Chapel ===
A splendid three-storey rectangular volume with a towering vaulted ceiling, the chapel has a projecting apse to the east, a mezzanine gallery to the west and holds a congregation of over 350 persons. Lit to each side by five, tall, narrow, coloured glass windows with decorative geometric grids featuring crosses and arcade motifs, the interior is finished in white painted plaster with ribs, compound columns and decorative features picked out in gold. Latticed ceiling roses vent the space. The sanctuary is within the projecting apse, lit by a small narrow light to each side and encircled by a blind arcade. It accommodates the original decorated marble reredos and altar with flanking angels on marble plinths on the rear elevated platform and a plainer freestanding marble altar to the lower front platform. The chapel houses a number of statues including those of the Sacred Heart, Our Lady, St Patrick, St Joseph, St Theresa and St Francis. A fine set of painted stations of the cross in carved timber frames hang on the walls. The sanctuary floor is carpeted (the original mosaic marble finish may survive under) and floors to the nave are parquetry. The gallery has a decorative timber panelled front of silky oak and is supported by handsome columns with a marble treatment.

Side doors open onto the colonnades of the flanking cloisters. The colonnade to the southeast is now enclosed and overlooks the courtyard a level below. The roof of the chapel colonnade to northeast is supported by white-painted concrete columns with cushion capitals and forms part of the encircling colonnade to the courtyard.

=== Courtyards ===
The north courtyard is an open space with some moveable tables, chairs and umbrellas. The south courtyard accommodates recent raised garden beds and a shade structure. A number of recent extensions and a freestanding rectangular building, none of which are considered to be of cultural heritage significance, intrude into the courtyard space and along the northeast side of the chapel.

=== Lift and lift tower ===
The external form of the lift tower to Warren Street survives and accommodates a modern lift.

=== Fence and entrance gates ===
A perimeter fence around the three street frontages comprises brick piers punctuating brick infill panels with decorative centres in a geometric pattern. A handsome white-painted concrete gateway embellished to match the front entrance porch houses a decorative solid metal double gate opening to the corner of St Paul's Terrace and Warren Street. A similar gate constructed to match this earliest gate also stands to the other St Paul's Terrace corner.

=== Views ===
The complex affords sweeping views across the CBD of Brisbane, Fortitude Valley and over to the Story Bridge.

== Heritage listing ==
Villa Maria Hostel was listed on the Queensland Heritage Register on 18 September 2008 having satisfied the following criteria.

The place is important in demonstrating the evolution or pattern of Queensland's history.

Opened in 1928, Villa Maria is significant as the first permanent home of the Sisters of Perpetual Adoration in Queensland and has remained a focal point for their activities until the present day. Villa Maria provides evidence of the development of the order in Queensland and the religious and social practices they implemented. Villa Maria is significant for its association with the social welfare program of the Catholic Church in the establishment of hostels and hospices, particularly for women.

Villa Maria is important as evidence for the period of expansion of the Catholic Church in Queensland during the 1920s and 1930s under the leadership of Archbishop James Duhig. Known for his particular interest in urban design and town planning, Villa Maria is an important component of Duhig's vision for Brisbane as a city of boulevards and fine buildings. The establishment of the convent and hostel reflects the active interest of Archbishop Duhig in the work of the Sisters of Perpetual Adoration and his confident building program which saw the establishment of many of the Catholic church's prominent buildings including Church of Saint Ignatius Loyola at Toowong, Corpus Christi Church at Nundah, part of All Hallows' School (All Hallows' School) and Nazareth House (Nazareth House).

The place is important in demonstrating the principal characteristics of a particular class of cultural places.

Villa Maria is significant for its considerable architectural merit, particularly the well-composed exterior and chapel, and is a fine example of the work of Hennessy & Hennessy, Keesing and Co and J.P. Donoghue, prominent architects in Brisbane and Sydney who undertook many projects for the Catholic church during Archbishop Duhig's time.

With its picturesque massing and finely crafted polychromatic brickwork, distinctive round arches, arcading, prominent tower, restrained ornamentation, geometric patterning in the brickwork and use of corbelling in a machicolation motif, Villa Maria is a notable example of a building in the Romanesque idiom, a style commonly employed in the design of religious places during the inter-war period.

The principal architectural component of the Villa Maria complex, the chapel, incorporates defining elements of the Romanesque most notably masonry construction, round arched windows, patterned brickwork, brick detailing including the machicolation motif; and within a towering vaulted ceiling, restrained embellishment and narrow coloured glass windows. It comprises the essential elements of a typical 20th century Catholic church including a collection of religious furniture and icons, in particular altars, statues and stations of the cross.

The place is important because of its aesthetic significance.

A prominent landmark on the elevated ridge of St Paul's Terrace, Spring Hill and visible from many parts of the immediate neighbourhoods of Fortitude Valley and the Brisbane CBD, Villa Maria is distinguished by its distinctive picturesque massing and fine polychromatic brickwork. It is distinguished by restrained embellishment including geometric patterning in the brickwork, decorative entrance porches and decorative corbelling.

Surviving original material includes joinery and finishes, particularly within the main entrance porch, chapel vestibule and chapel including fine timber panelled doors, glazed fanlights, coloured glass windows with cross and arcade motifs, and painted decorative murals. The chapel has a towering vaulted ceiling, narrow coloured glass windows and fine quality furniture and finishes including polished timber pews, parquetry flooring, timber panelling to the galley marble treated columns.

Villa Maria is notable for the expansive views it affords across Brisbane CBD, Spring Hill and Fortitude Valley.

The place has a special association with the life or work of a particular person, group or organisation of importance in Queensland's history.

Villa Maria is important for its association with the Sisters of Perpetual Adoration, who have maintained a presence on this site since 1900. The place has been associated with the work of the Sisters in caring for the aged and infirm for over 70 years, and for a time, in offering accommodation for young women working in Brisbane.
