= Manor Apartment Hotel =

Heritage-listed hotel in Brisbane, Queensland

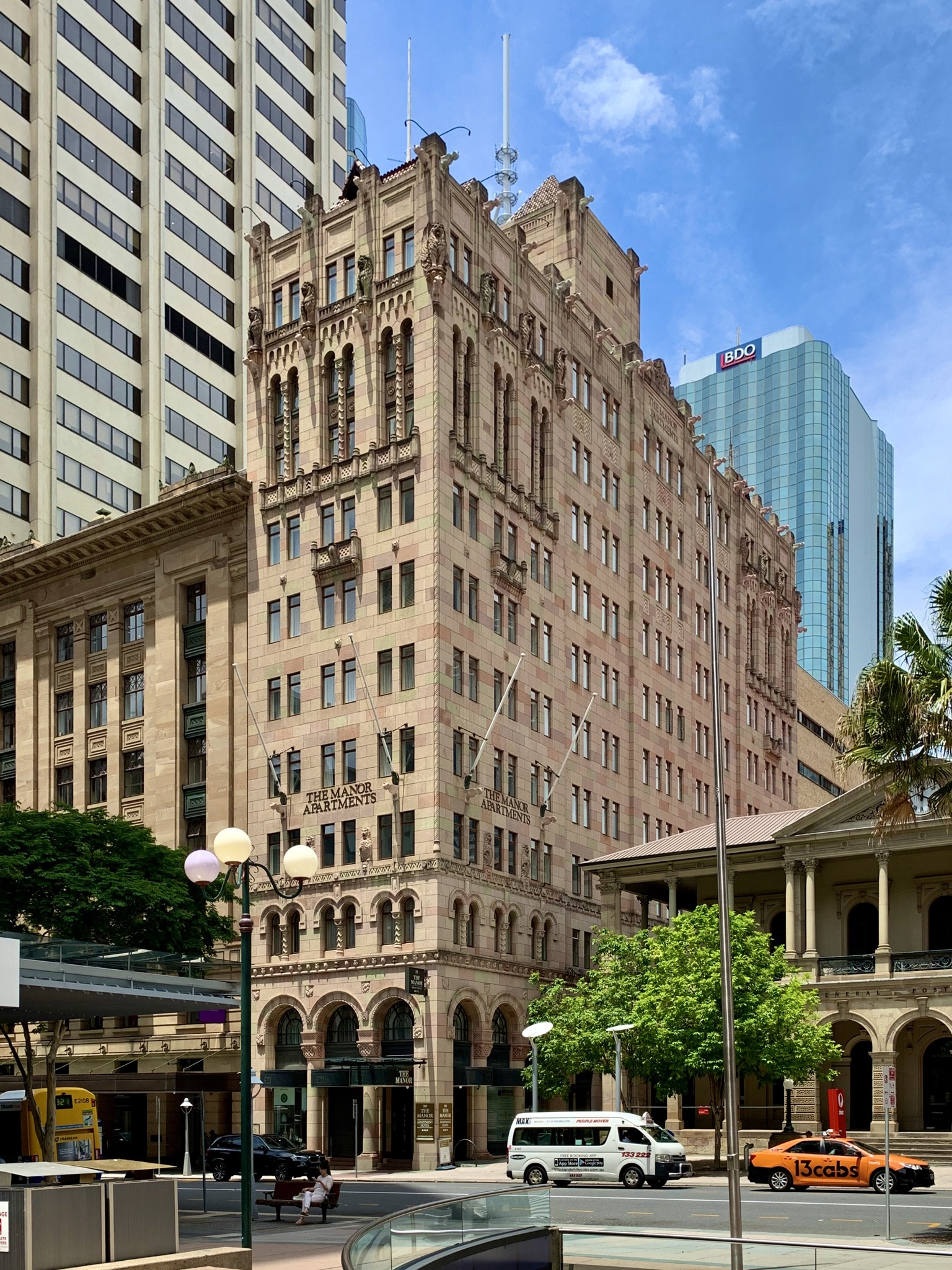
- Manor Apartment Hotel, 2020

- Location within Queensland
- 27.4677°S 153.0283°E
- Location: 289 Queen Street, Brisbane City, City of Brisbane, Queensland, Australia

History
- Design period: 1919–1930s (interwar period)
- Built: 1930–1931

Site notes
- Architect: Hennessey, Hennessey & Co

Queensland Heritage Register
- Official name: Newspaper House, Colonial Mutual Life Building, The Manor Apartments
- Type: state heritage (built)
- Designated: 21 October 1992
- Reference no.: 600150
- Significant period: 1930–1931 (fabric); 1931–1983 (historical)
- Significant components: decorative features, furniture/fittings
- Builders: Concrete Constructions (QLD) Limited

Manor Apartment Hotel is a heritage-listed former office building and now apartment hotel at 289 Queen Street, Brisbane City, City of Brisbane, Queensland, Australia. It was designed by Hennessey, Hennessey & Co and built from 1930 to 1931 by Concrete Constructions (QLD) Limited. It is also known as Colonial Mutual Life Building and Newspaper House. It was added to the Queensland Heritage Register on 21 October 1992.

== History ==
The building was constructed between 1930 and 1931 for Colonial Mutual Life Assurance Society (CML).

=== First building ===
The Queensland branch of CML was formed in June 1874. In 1883 the society built offices at 62 Queen Street (Colonial Mutual Chambers). In August 1906 CML purchased this site at 289 Queen Street, adjacent to the General Post Office in the heart of the Brisbane Central Business District, and constructed new premises. The first building was demolished in 1930 to enable the construction of a new commodious building on the site for the expanding society. Between 1925 and 1934 much of the south side of Queen Street was redeveloped, including National Mutual Life Association Building (1926), the Commonwealth Bank (1929) and the Australian Mutual Provident Society building (1931–1934).

=== Current building ===
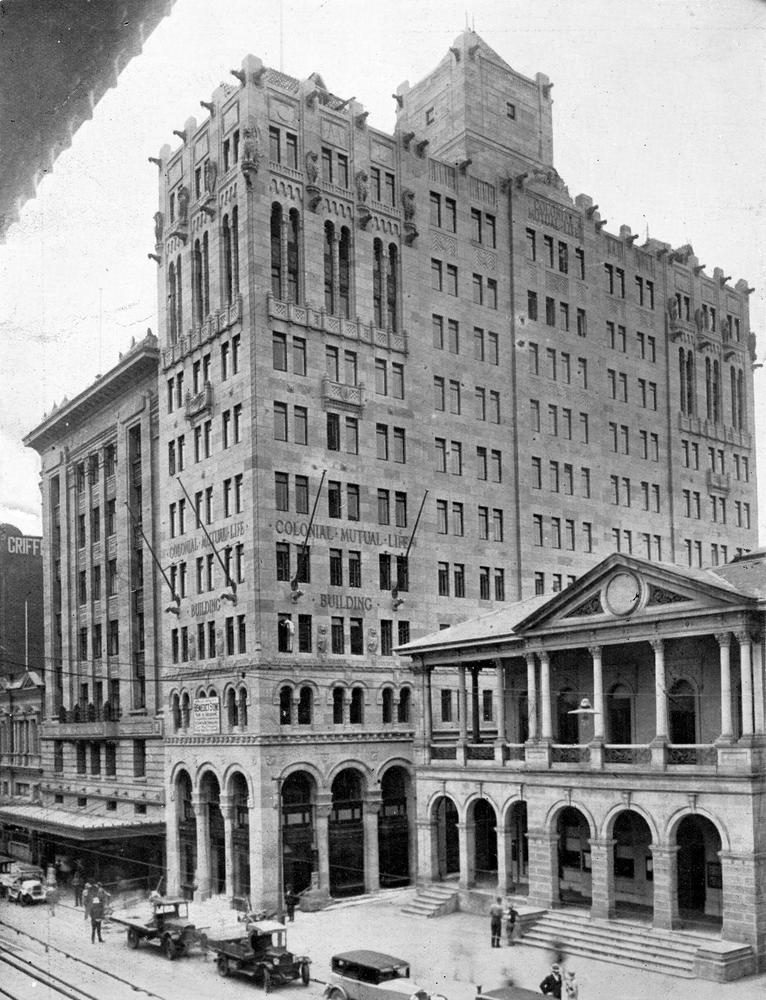
Colonial Mutual Life Building (later Newspaper House, Manor Apartment Hotel), Queen Street, Brisbane and General Post Office, 1931

To compensate for the site's narrow frontage of 33 feet (10 m), an agreement was made between the Commonwealth authorities, who administer the adjoining General Post Office, and CML to allow a "right-of-way to extend the full depth of the building". In October 1930, the yet-to-demolished buildings sustained some damage following a fire; however, the fire was not the reason for the construction of the current building (as some sources suggest) as the plans had already been announced a month earlier. Demolition of the old offices was underway by November 1930, with construction of the current building well underway by February 1931.

=== Construction ===
The Benedict stone used for the facing, a mixture of cement and crushed Brisbane tuff was manufactured by Benedict Stone (Qld) Pty Ltd which was established by Archbishop James Duhig to manufacture the stone required for the Holy Name Cathedral, Fortitude Valley. The product was developed at the turn of the twentieth century by American manufacturer, Benedict. Duhig obtained a licence from America and opened the Benedict Stone works at Bowen Hills on 9 August 1929. In February 1930 CML advanced Duhig a £70,000 mortgage on his properties which included the stone works. A mutually dependent relationship developed between CML, Duhig and Jack Hennessey, architect. CML used Benedict stone to build a number of their Australian offices, ensuring some of their mortgage was repaid and employed Hennessey and Concrete Constructions (Qld) Ltd, Brisbane (Duhig's architect and contractor for the Holy Name Cathedral). As Hennessey, Hennessey & Co., was based in Sydney, construction was supervised by Leo Drinan, the firm's Brisbane Manager. Concrete Construction (Qld) Ltd also built the CML offices in Sydney and Melbourne. George Harvey was responsible for the masonry work on the building and may have created the gargoyles on the façade. The stone was delivered and positioned within seven months, setting an Australian record for stonework. Built during an economic depression, its construction provided employment for many Queensland workers.

=== Opening ===
On 12 November 1931 the CML building was officially opened by the Governor, Lieutenant-General Sir John Goodwin. The ground floor provided offices for Colonial Mutual and the arcade leading to Queen Street contained retail premises. The offices and professional suites on the upper floors were available for lease.

=== Later owners ===
Queensland Newspapers (a subsidiary of News Corporation and publisher of The Courier-Mail newspaper) purchased the site in September 1983, cleaned and repaired the exterior and re-opened the building as Newspaper House on 11 September 1985.

=== Current use ===
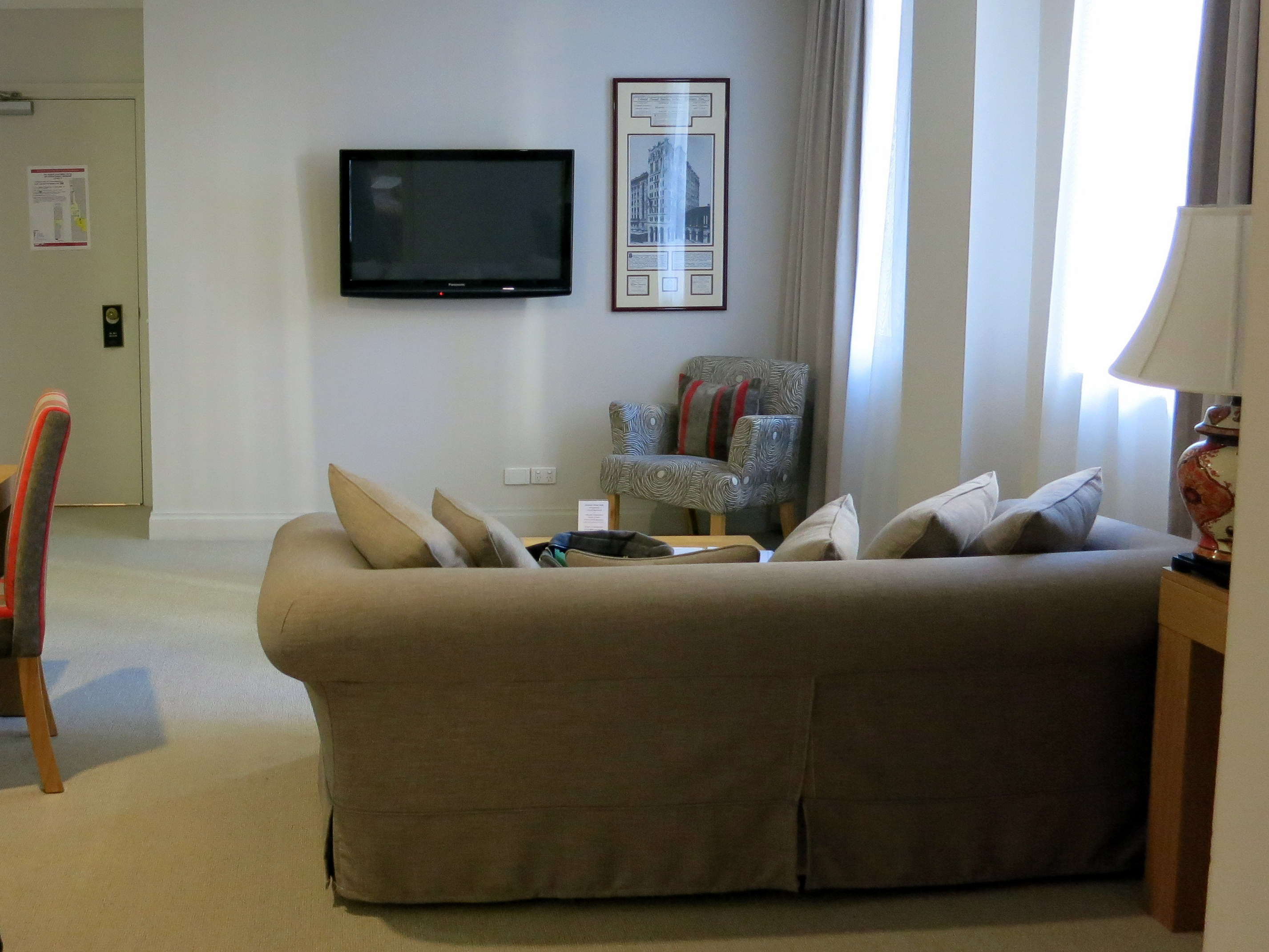
Part of a room in the Manor Apartment Hotel in 2015

In 1994, the building was converted and fully refurbished to become an apartment hotel, The Manor Apartments, comprising 46 studio, one- and two-bedroom apartments each with its own fully equipped kitchen and laundry and separate and fully furnished bedrooms and living areas. The apartments are air-conditioned, but windows may still be opened. The 1930s origins of the building are still evident in the classically spacious and high-ceiling interiors and in the special stonework and sculptures.

The building was used as a stand in for a New York City skyscraper in the 1996 film The Phantom.

== Description ==
This inter-war commercial building is ten storeys high with a narrow frontage to Queen Street and a long side elevation. It has been designed in sympathy with adjoining buildings, matching the arcade of the GPO at its base and responding to the parapet line of the National Mutual Life Building in its upper levels. The building has a concrete encased steel frame with concrete floors and is faced in Benedict Stone, the colours of which range from green to pink (a property of Brisbane tuff). The style of the sculptured ornament on the building facades is influenced by American Art Deco buildings of this period, as well as containing some Norman influence. It is similar in style to interstate Colonial Mutual Life Assurance Society Ltd buildings.

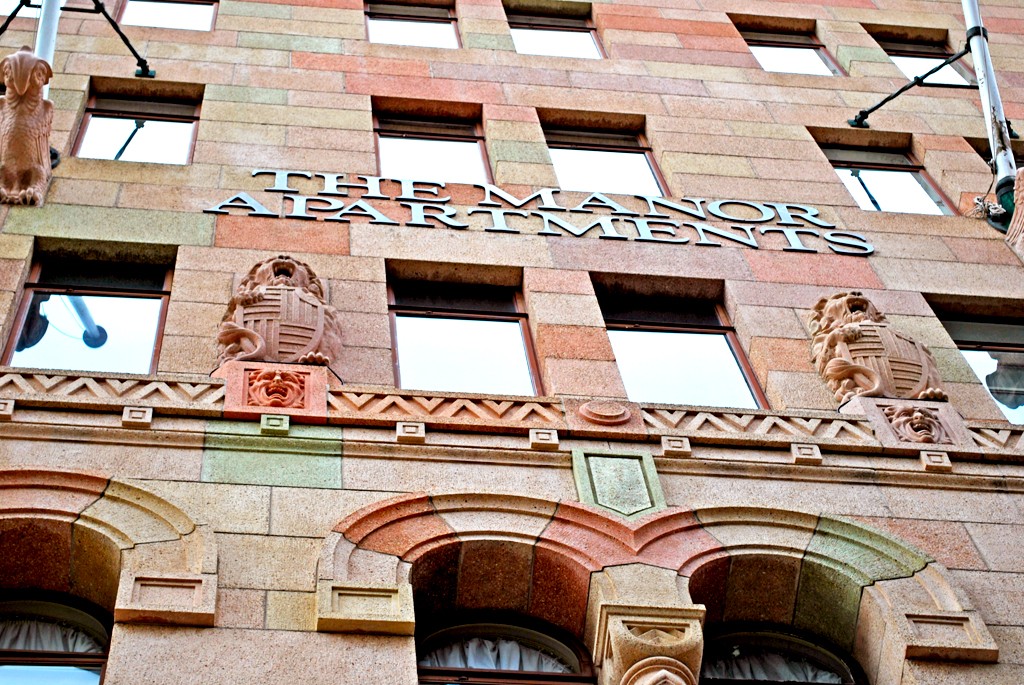
Closer view of the Benedict Stone and sculptures, 2012

The building has three paired window bays across the Queen Street facade. Three double height arched openings occur at the ground floor level. On the level above are paired window openings with arched heads and a central ornamented column. The two levels below the top floor have paired window bays which are similar but double the height. At the base of these is an imitation balcony with balusters supported on brackets. In this way the building has both a distinctive top and base. A similar projecting balcony occurs in front of the central window bay on the level below. Above the double height bays at the base of the top level sculptured lions stand on projecting brackets. The one facing the corner is winged. The parapet has raised portions each with a projecting stylised eagle "gargoyle". Similar gargoyles appear in the same location a level below and also below each projecting flag post above the third floor.

The entire Queen Street facade is repeated at each end of the side elevation, the central bays of which are plainer. Behind the parapet the building has an interesting roofscape of steeply pitched terracotta tiled roofs, one above the caretakers quarters and another over the lift room on the eleventh floor. At street level individual awnings have been located between the archways. From the rear laneway the building duplicates much of the front facade but is painted.

Internally the original detailing remains in the fire stairs, including the handrail and tiled landings. All the levels have been refurbished with suspended ceilings that sit below the window heads.

== Heritage listing ==
The building was listed on the Register of the National Estate in 1987. However, that register no longer has any statutory significance.

The Manor Apartment Hotel was listed on the Queensland Heritage Register on 21 October 1992 having met its criteria, for the following reasons:

- The building is important in demonstrating the pattern of Queensland's history, in particular the commercial redevelopment of this portion of Queen Street during the period 1925–34.
- The building is important in demonstrating the principal characteristics of an inter-war commercial building.
- The building exhibits particular aesthetic characteristics valued by the community including its rich decoration including gargoyles, shields, lions, friezes and relief blocks and its two finely detailed facades which complement important elements of the adjoining buildings and contribute to the visual cohesiveness of this portion of Queen Street.
- The building is important in demonstrating a high degree of technical achievement through the use of locally produced Benedict stone which was an innovative building material in Brisbane in the early 1930s.
- Newspaper House has a special association with the relationship between the Colonial Mutual Life Assurance Society, Archbishop Duhig and architects Hennessey, Hennessey and Co.
