= Frank Cullen =

Australian architect (1909–1991)

Frank Cullen (2 February 1909 – 2 November 1991) was an Australian architect, who designed over 200 churches, schools, monasteries, convents and other church related buildings in Queensland and Northern New South Wales, Australia.

== Early life ==
Francis Leo Cullen was born on 2 February 1909 in Albion, Brisbane, Queensland to Frank Cullen and his wife Elizabeth Duhig, the sister of Catholic Archbishop James Duhig. He was educated at St Joseph's Gregory Terrace.

== Career ==
Frank studied his Diploma in Architecture from the Brisbane Central Technical College. He was an articled pupil of Sydney architectural firm, Hennessy, Hennessy and Company from 1928 to 1933. Cullen then went on to work for the Queensland Government as draughtsman from 1933 to 1934. He became assistant architect with H.V.M Brown of Mackay from 1934–35 and then formed his own partnership of Cullen and Egan from 1937 to 1941. He received a number of commissions through his contacts with the Roman Catholic Church Archbishop James Duhig. In the 1960s, he was a partner in Cullen, Fagg, Hargraves and Mooney. They took on a number of church design projects.

== Personal life and death ==
Cullen married Mary Cronin in April 1941. Cullen on died 2 November 1991 and is buried in Glamorgan Vale Cemetery.

== Legacy ==
Approximately 1500 architectural plans and drawings from the firm of Cullen and Partners are held in the University of Queensland Fryer Library.

== Notable works ==
- Church, Somerset Dam via Esk (1936)
- St Luke's Church, Woolloongabba (1936)
- St Columba's Church, Wilston (1936)
- Holy Spirit School, New Farm (1937)
- St Sebastian's School, Yeronga (1937)
- Villa Maria extension (1938)
- St Joseph's School, North Ipswich (1939)
- St Mary's School, Beaudesert (1939)
- Kenilworth Hotel, Kenilworth (1939)
- Bribie Hotel, Bribie Island (1940)
- St Philomena's Catholic Church, Basin Pocket, Ipswich (1940)
- Mount St Michael's School, Ashgrove (1941)
- Christian Brothers’ College, Greenslopes (1941)
- Nurses Home, Mater Hospital, Bundaberg (1945)
- Monto Hospital, Nurses Quarters, Monto (1948)
- Marist Brothers College, Rosalie (1948)
- St Peters School, Rockhampton (1950)
- Star of the Sea School, Gladstone (1950)
- Sisters of Mercy Convent, Bardon (1950)
- St Joseph's Catholic Church, Nambour (1951)
- Our Lady of the Assumption Infant's School, Enoggera (1955)
- St Finbarr's Church, Ashgrove (1957)
- McAuley Hall, All Hallows School, Brisbane (1958)
- St Monica's Church, Tugun (1959)
- St Joseph's School, Murgon (1962)
- St John's Church, Northgate (1962)
- Memorial Church of Our Lady of Mt Carmel, Coorparoo (1963–64)
- Our Lady of Dolours Church, Mitchelton (1964)
