= B. B. Whitehouse =

B. B. Whitehouse, later known as Whitehouse Brothers, were organ builders based in Brisbane, Queensland, Australia.

== History ==
The firm was founded in the early 1900s by Benjamin Burton Whitehouse junior and Joseph Howell Whitehouse.

== Commissioned organs ==
- St. Mark's Church, Warwick, 1923 (pencil drawing of organ amongst plans owned by Conrad Dornbusch (architect in Warwick) who designed the organ loft for that church in 1923 (Dornbusch collection, held by R. Wood, Sydney, 2020).
- Holy Trinity Anglican Church, Woolloongabba (1930)
- First Church of Christ, Scientist, Brisbane (1940)
- St Ignatius Loyola Church, Toowong (1959)
- Wynnum Baptist Church (1952), relocated in 1993 to St Paul's Anglican Church, East Brisbane
- Christ Church, Milton (prior to 1984)
- Corpus Christi Church, Nundah
