= John Francis Hennessy =

Australian architect (1853-1924)

John Francis Hennessy (1853–1924) was an Australian architect practicing in New South Wales in the 1880s-1910s, concentrating on projects for the Catholic Church.

== Personal life ==
John Francis Hennessy was born in Ireland about 1853, and grew up and trained in architecture in Leeds, and London. Deciding that there were more opportunities in Australia, he arrived in Sydney in 1880 and was soon appointed assistant to the city architect, where he worked on the Centennial Hall of the Sydney Town Hall in 1883. The family lived for many years in Burwood, where he designed the Town Hall in 1887, and was an alderman 1890–1895, and mayor in 1892–93.

During his presidency of the Institute of Architects of New South Wales in 1911–12, the registration of architects was achieved. He helped to establish the chair of architecture at the University of Sydney and to secure the recognition of public competition for public buildings.

== Professional life ==
John Hennessy was in partnership with Joseph Sheerin as Sheerin & Hennessy from 1884 until Sheerin left the partnership in 1912. Both were devout Catholics, active in Church charities, and were friends of Archbishop (Cardinal) Moran, and were commissioned for a number of large projects for the church, including two large colleges and the Cathedral of St Mary and St Joseph in Armidale, in country NSW. Hennessy then went into partnership with his son, also named, John Francis Hennessy, as Hennessy & Hennessy from 1912 to 1923, when he retired. His son retained the name and went make the firm one of the most successful commercial practices in the 1930s in Australia and New Zealand.

== Later life ==
John Hennessy died only a year after retiring in November 1924 at his home in Belmore Street, Burwood. His requiem mass was held at St Mary's Catholic Church in Concord where he regularly worshipped. He was buried in Rookwood Cemetery.

== Works ==
- St Joseph's College, Hunters Hill (1884–94)
- St Vincent's College, Potts Point (1886)
- Hotel Metropole, Sydney (1888–1890)
- St Patrick's Seminary, Manly (1885-1889)
- Sacred Heart Monastery, Kensington (1897)
- Burwood Council Chambers (1887)
- City Tattersalls Club (1890)
- Cathedral of St Mary and St Joseph, Armidale (1910–11)
- Plan for Daceyville garden suburb in Sydney, with John Sulman (1912).

Professional and academic associations
Preceded by George Birrell Robertson	President of the Institute of Architects of New South Wales; 1911–1912	Succeeded by George Sydney Jones
