= Hennessy & Hennessy =

Australian architectural firm (1912–1968)

- Type: Architectural firm
- Founded: 1912 in Sydney, Australia
- Founder: John (Jack) Hennessy

Hennessy & Hennessy was an architectural firm established in 1912 in Sydney, Australia that was responsible for a series of large scale office buildings in the 1930s in all capital cities in Australia, as well as New Zealand and South Africa, designed by John (Jack) Hennessy (1887–1955), described as Australia's first international architect.

The firm was also responsible for many projects for the Catholic Church in Brisbane in the 1920s, including the never-built Holy Name Cathedral, Brisbane, which would have been 'the largest sacred building in the Commonwealth'. They were also the architects for the Great Court of the University of Queensland in Brisbane.

== History ==
=== John Francis Hennessy, father and son ===
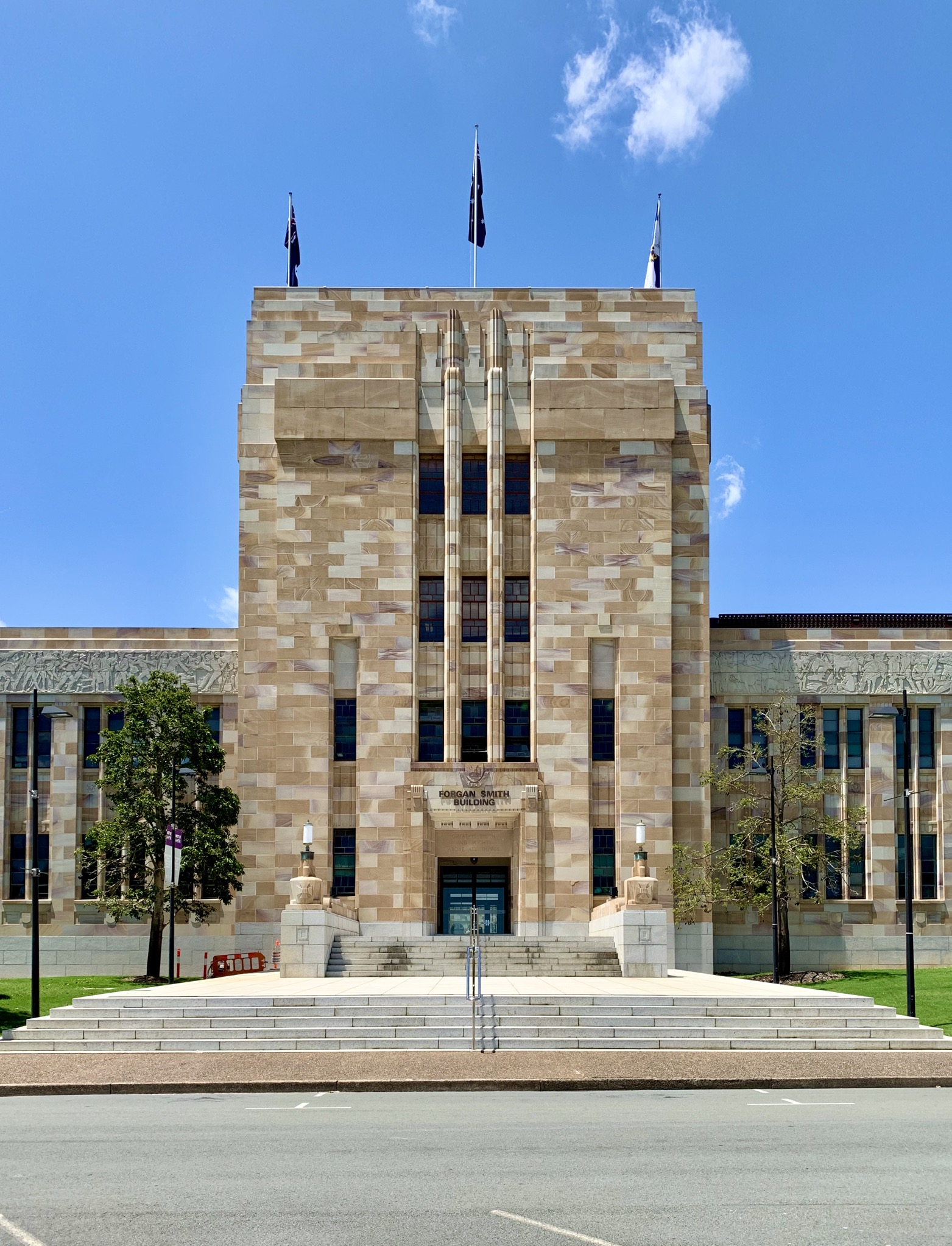
University of Queensland Great Court main entrance

The firm's name dates from the period when John Francis Hennessy took his son, also named John Francis (Jack) Hennessy, but often known as Jack Hennessy, into his architectural firm as a partner in 1912.

The first John Francis Hennessy (1853–1924) was born in Ireland about 1853, and grew up and trained in architecture in Leeds, and London. Deciding that there were more opportunities in Australia, he arrived in Sydney in 1880 and was soon appointed assistant to the City of Sydney architect, where he designed Centennial Hall of the Sydney Town Hall in 1883, (working on it after he left that position).

He then went into private partnership with Joseph Ignatius Sheerin as Sheerin & Hennessy from 1884, and they went on to design a number of projects for the Catholic Church in Sydney, and the Cathedral in Armidale. Commercial designs included Hordern Bros' drapery store (1886), the Tattersall's Club (1892) in Pitt Street, and ten stores for John See, and many large suburban residences were built to their plans.

Sheerin left the partnership in 1912, and Hennessy then went into partnership with his son, John Francis (Jack) Hennessy, and the firm became Hennessy & Hennessy. Born in 1887, Jack Hennessy had studied architecture at Sydney Technical College and at the University of Pennsylvania, returning to Australia in 1911, joining his father's firm the next year. John Hennessy retired in 1923, and died in November 1924 and was buried in Rookwood Cemetery. Jack Hennessy became principal of the firm, retaining the name (though they were also known as Hennessy, Hennessy & Co.). In 1925–6 the firm had more partners and was briefly known as Hennessy & Hennessy, Keesing and Co and J.P. Donoghue, but after 1926 reverted to Hennessy, Hennessy & Co / Hennessy & Hennessy.

=== Architectural practice ===
The year the younger Hennessy joined the firm they gained one of their most prestigious commissions, the completion of the huge Gothic Revival St Mary's Cathedral, Sydney. Designed by William Wardell, only the apse, crossing and transept had been finished; the Hennessy's were to build the nave and south front to Wardell's design, as well as the crypt, built to their design. Further commissions for the Catholic Church followed with St Patrick's Hall in Sydney in 1915.

Bishop James Duhig, having already become friends with the younger Hennessy, became a major patron once he was elevated to Archbishop of Brisbane in 1917. Beginning with the Convent of the Sacred Heart in Toowong, completed in 1920, Hennessy and Hennessy designed the Convent of the Sacred Heart (1922), St Vincent's Hospital (1922) and the Church of Saint Ignatius Loyola(1929) all in Toowong, Corpus Christi Church in Nundah (1926) and the Villa Maria Convent, in Fortitude Valley, Brisbane (1928). They were also commissioned to complete the 19th century Brisbane Catholic Cathedral St Stephen's in 1920–22, in a smaller form than original envisaged because he had plans to build a far grander cathedral on another site. In 1925 Jack Hennessy produced a plan for a huge church intended to be "the largest sacred building in the Commonwealth" for a site in Fortitude Valley on the edge of the central city. The Renaissance/Baroque style design, inspired by St Paul's in London, had a dome and paired front towers, and was to be called the Holy Name Cathedral Construction began in 1927, but by the early 1930s only some retaining walls and the crypt had been built, and no further work was ever undertaken.

In the 1930s Hennessy designed a series large office buildings for three different insurance firms in three countries, and has been described as Australia's first international architect. The series of buildings for the Colonial Mutual Life insurance company were all versions of each other, in different sizes, in an elaborate Romanesque/Norman style, complete with gargoyles.

Another major project was the Great Court, University of Queensland in St Lucia, Brisbane, built between 1938 and 1979.

In 1950, Hennessy was awarded over £25,000 by the court when he sued to recover his unpaid fees for the Holy Name Cathedral.

Hennessy died of heart disease at his eldest son's home in Sydney on September 4, 1955, at the age of 68. He was buried in the Roman Catholic Cemetery at Rookwood. The firm continued until 1968.

== Major Works ==
- 1912–1940s: completion of St Mary's Cathedral, Sydney
- 1915: St Patrick's Parish Hall and Girls' School, Harrington Street, Sydney
- 1920: Stuartholme (Convent of the Sacred Heart), Toowong, Brisbane.
- 1922: Cathedral of St Stephen, Brisbane, apse and transepts
- 1922: St Vincent's Hospital, Toowoomba
- 1925–31: Christian Brothers' Training College (Mount St Mary) Strathfield, Sydney.
- 1926: Corpus Christi Church in Nundah, Brisbane
- 1927–28: Villa Maria Convent, Fortitude Valley, Brisbane
- 1929: Church of Saint Ignatius Loyola in Toowong, Brisbane
- 1929: Additional floors to CML building, Martin Place, Sydney, later removed
- 1930–31: Colonial Mutual Life, Brisbane
- 1931–33: Colonial Mutual Life, Durban, South Africa
- 1934: Sacred Heart Church, Pymble, Sydney (now Ku Ring Gai town hall)
- 1934: Colonial Mutual Life, Adelaide
- 1935: Colonial Mutual Life, Wellington, New Zealand (demolished)
- 1934: Prudential Insurance, Wellington, New Zealand
- 1934–5: Cardinal Cerretti Memorial Chapel, St Patrick's Seminary, Manly, Sydney.
- 1935: Colonial Mutual Life, Port Elizabeth, South Africa
- 1936: Lawson Apartments, Perth
- 1936: Colonial Mutual Life, Perth (demolished)
- 1936: Australasian Catholic Assurance, Sydney
- 1936: Australasian Catholic Assurance, Melbourne
- 1937: Colonial Mutual Life, Hobart
- 1937: Colonial Mutual Life, Newcastle
- 1937 Challis House, Martin Place, Sydney
- 1937: St John of God Hospital, Belmont (Rivervale), Perth (demolished)
- 1937–79: Great Court, University of Queensland, St Lucia, Brisbane
- 1939: Colonial Mutual Life, Great Charles Street, Birmingham, UK
- 1939: Prudential Insurance, Martin Place, Sydney (demolished)
- 1941: Pius XII Provincial Seminary, Banyo, Brisbane.
- 1963: The chapel at Stuartholme Catholic Girls' School, Brisbane

== Gallery ==
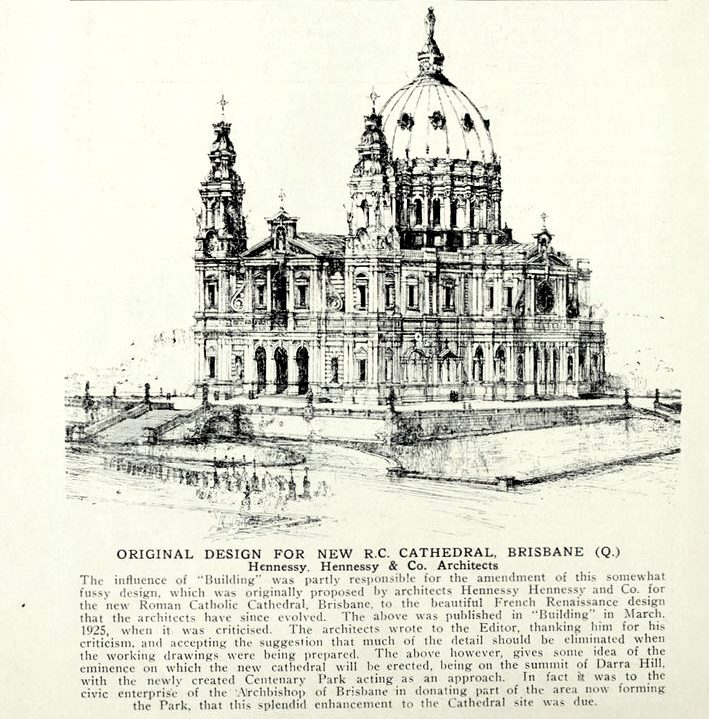
Holy Name Cathedral Brisbane design 1925

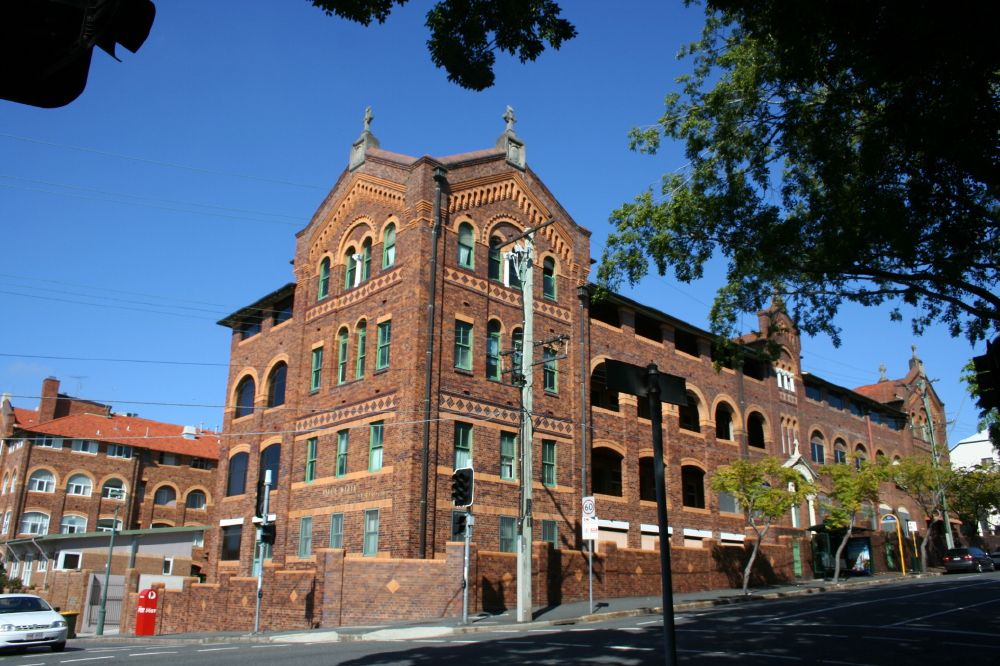
Villa Maria Hostel, 1928

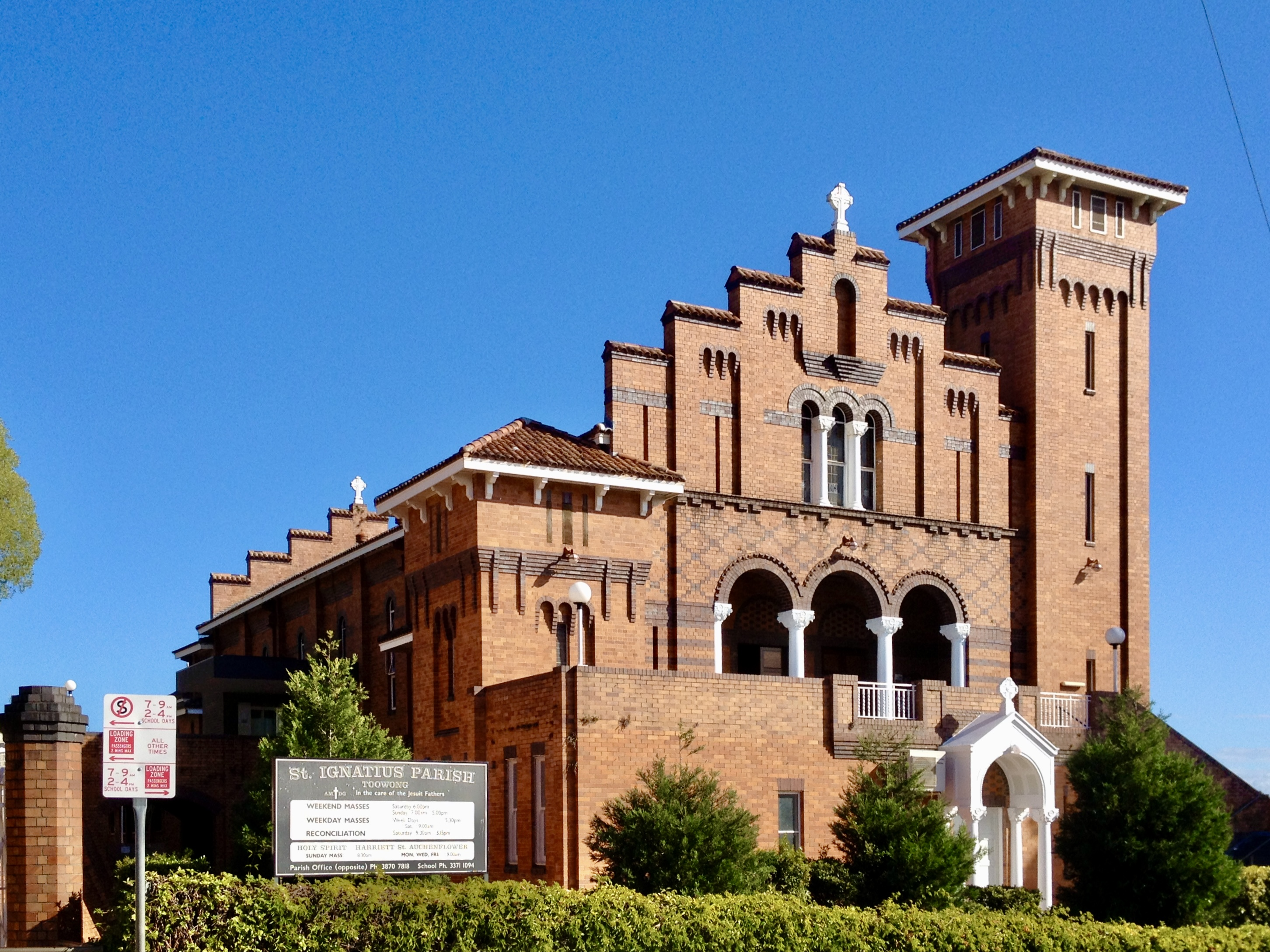
St Ignatius Church, Toowong, 1929

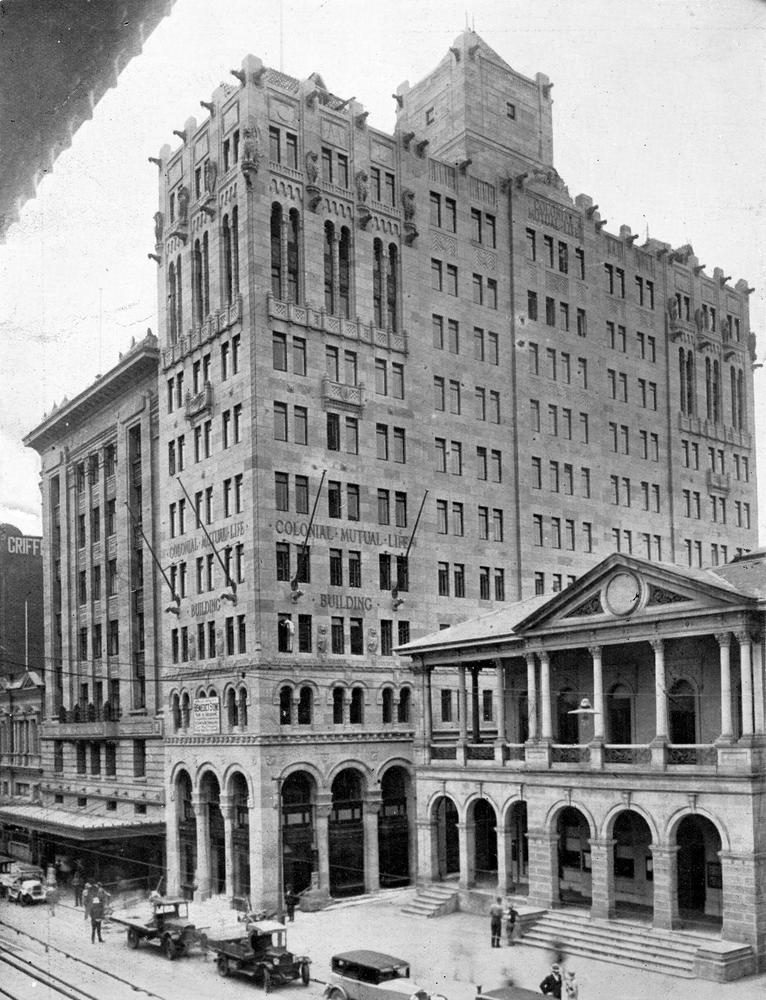
Colonial Mutual Life, Brisbane, 1931

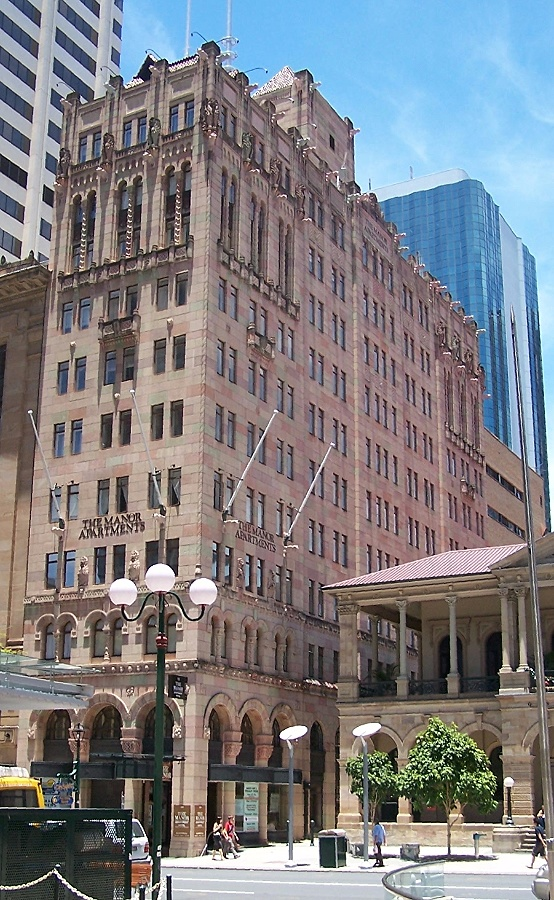
Colonial Mutual Life, Brisbane, 1931

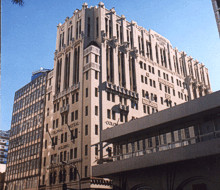
Colonial Mutual, Durban, South Africa, 1933

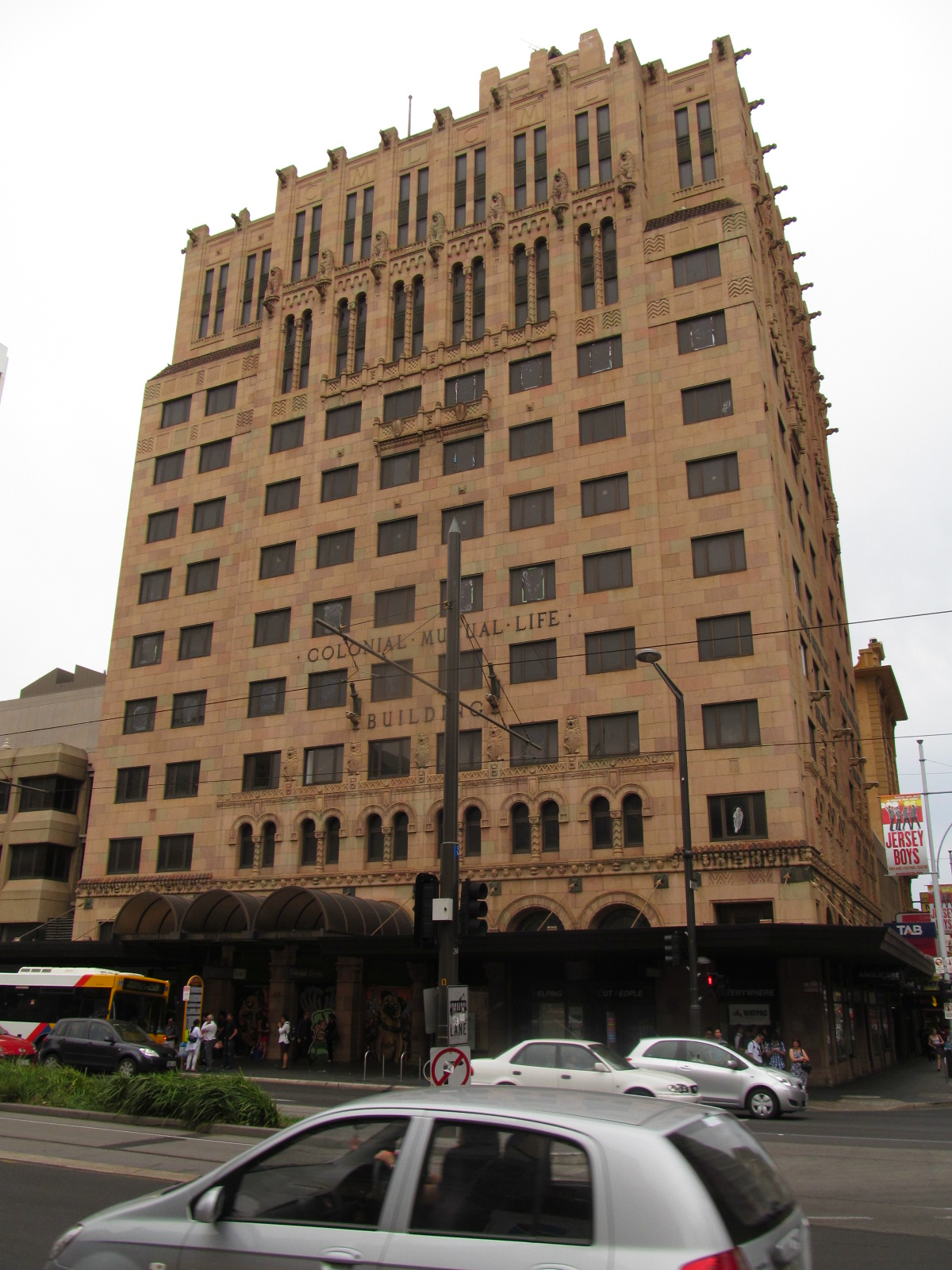
Colonial Mutual Life, Adelaide, 1934

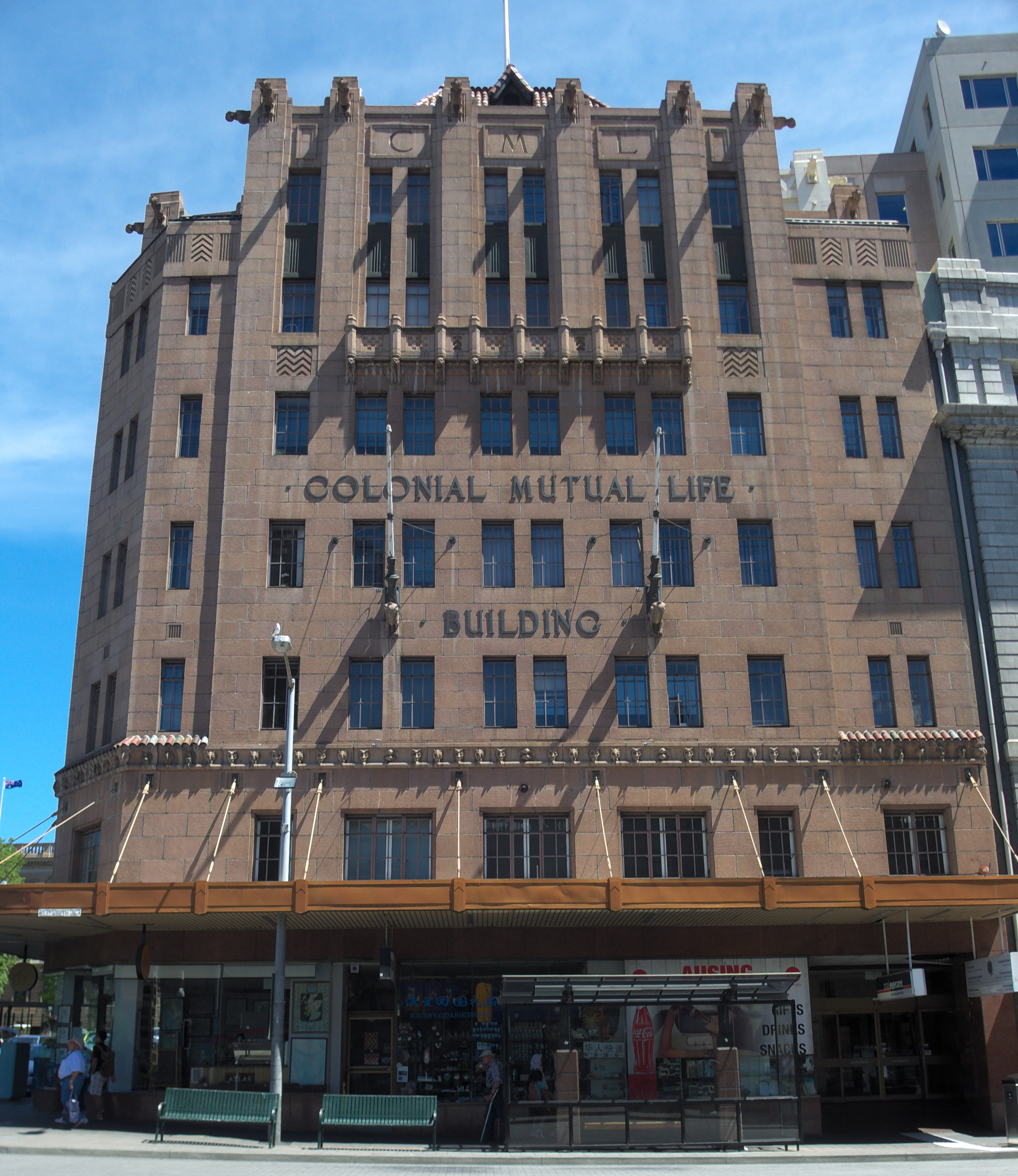
Colonial Mutual Life, Hobart, 1937

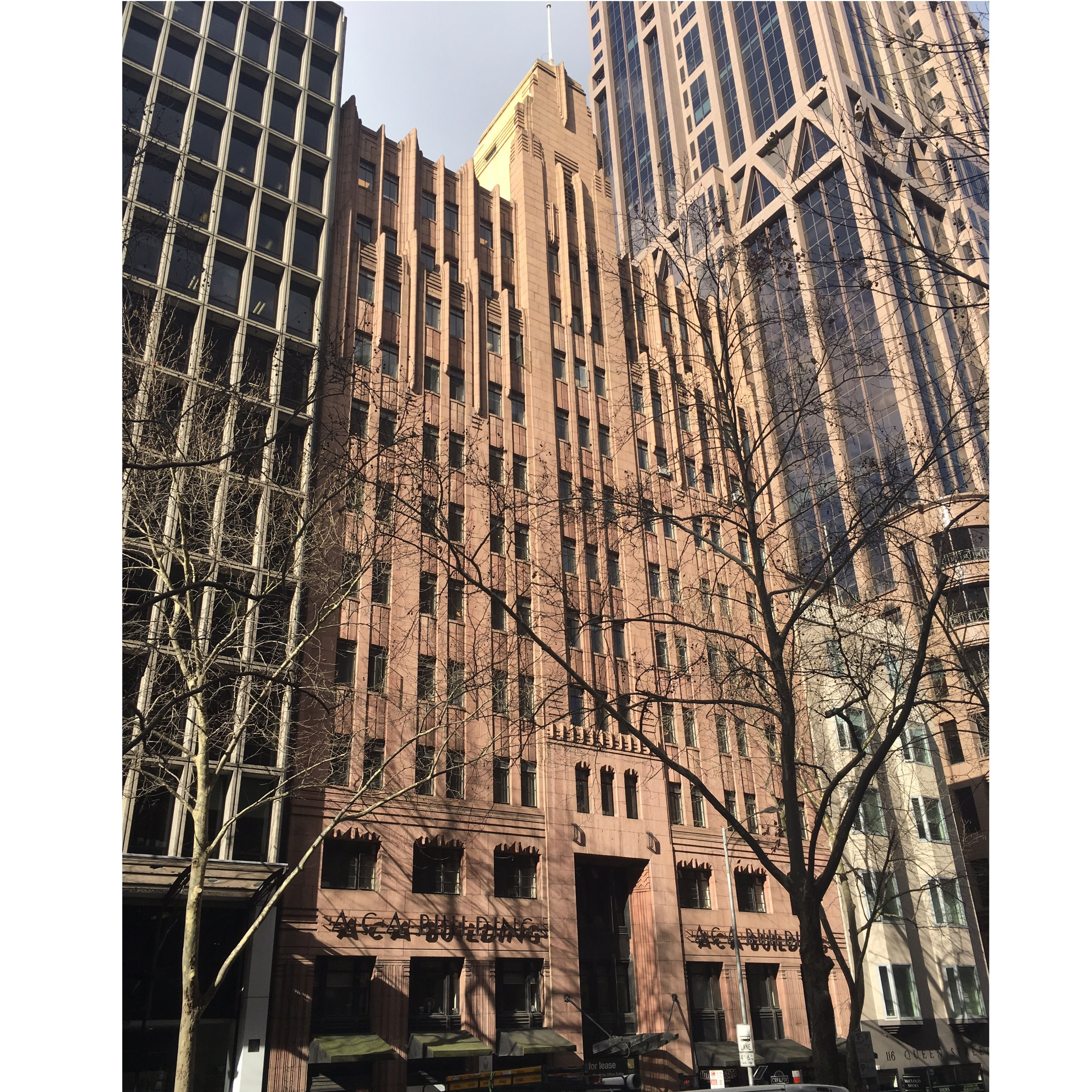
Australian Catholic Assurance Building, Melbourne, 1936

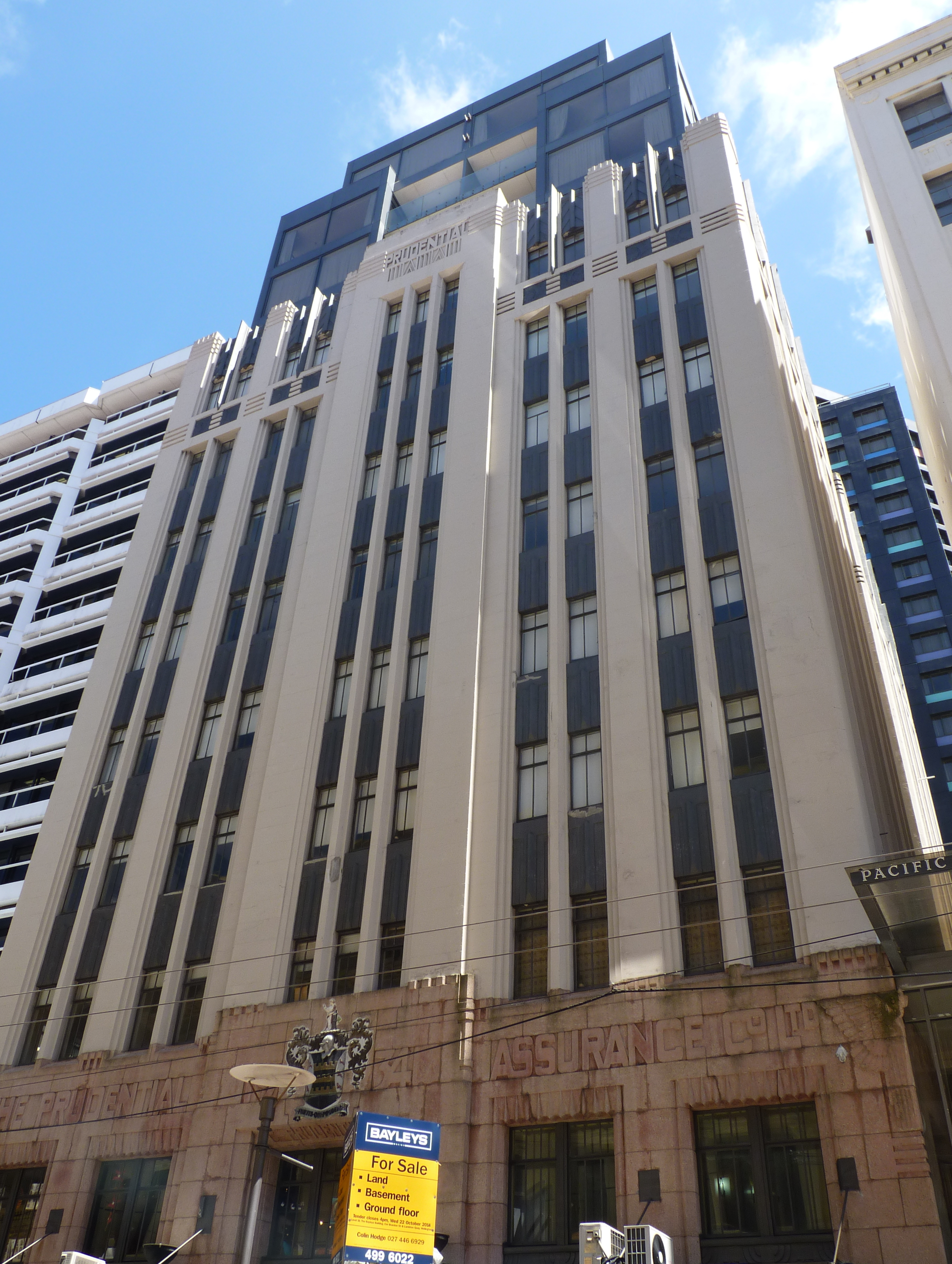
Prudential Insurance, Wellington, New Zealand, 1835

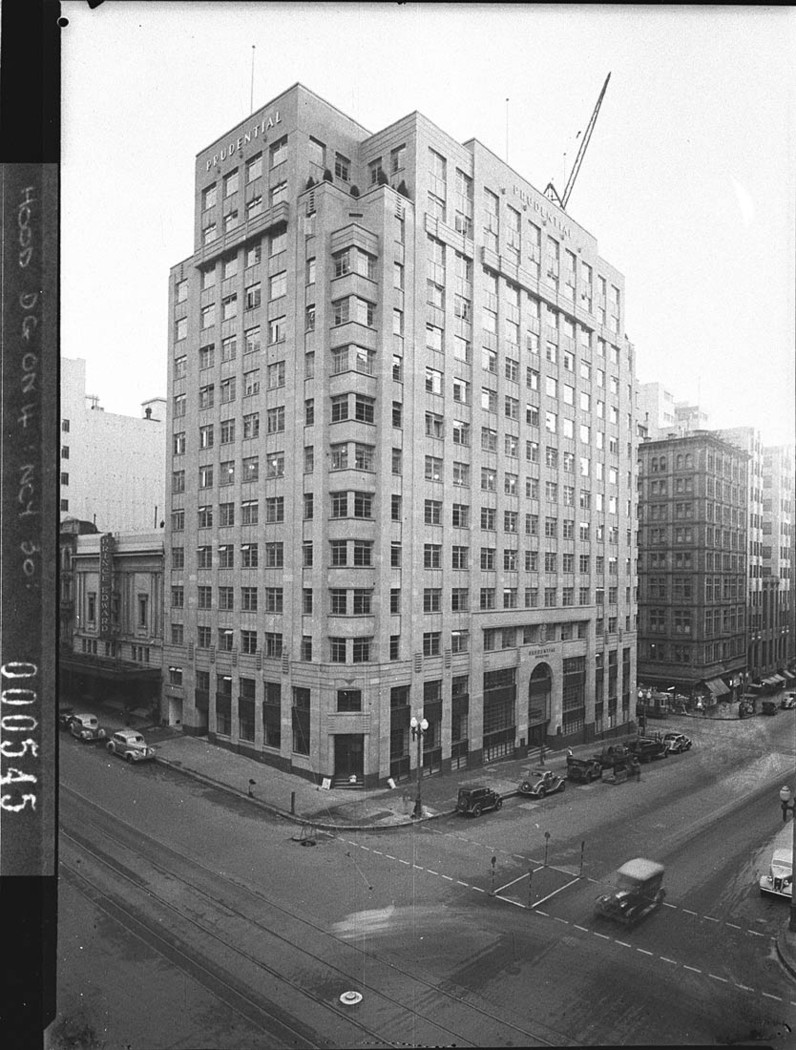
Prudential Insurance Martin Place, Sydney, 1939

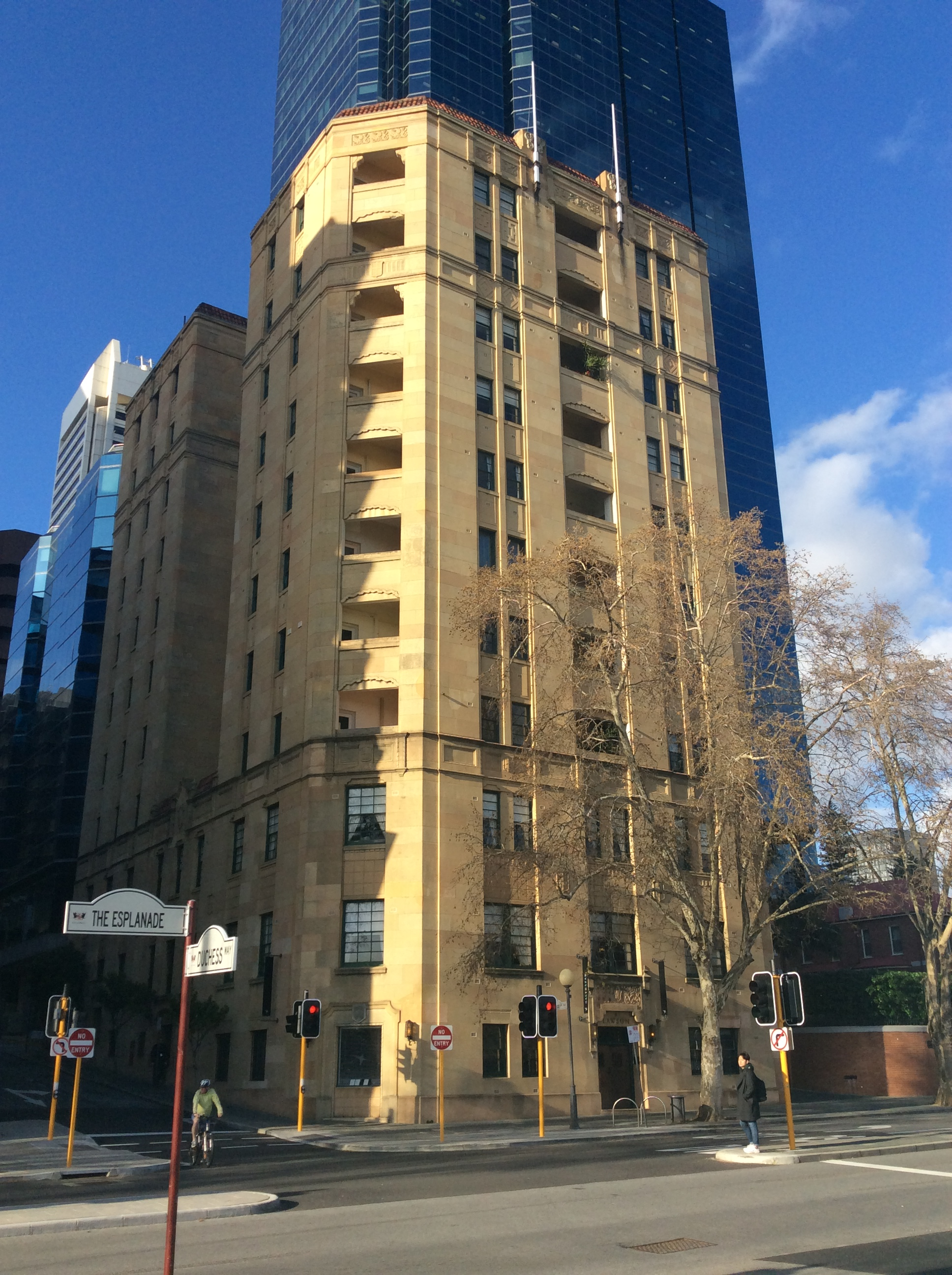
Lawson Apartments, Perth, 1937

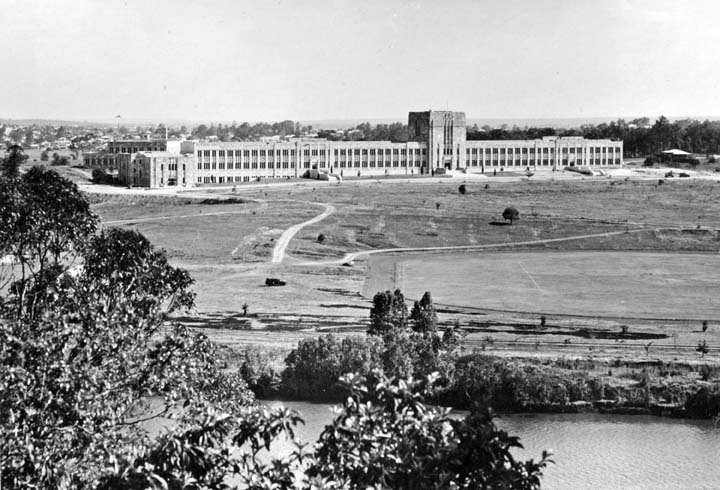
Queensland University Great Court frontage in 1948

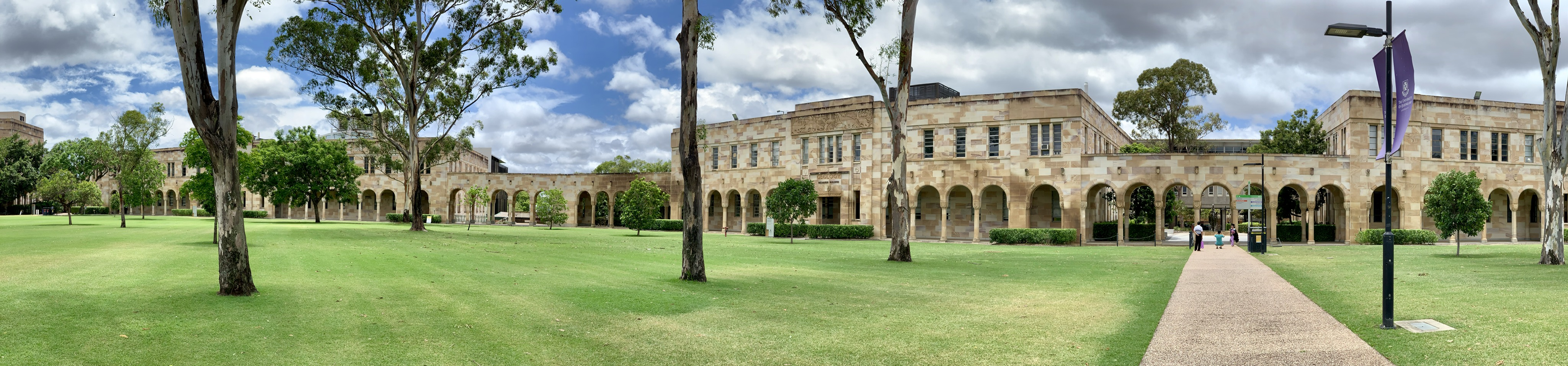
The Great Court, University of Queensland
