= St Ignatius Loyola Church, Toowong =

Church of Saint Ignatius Loyola
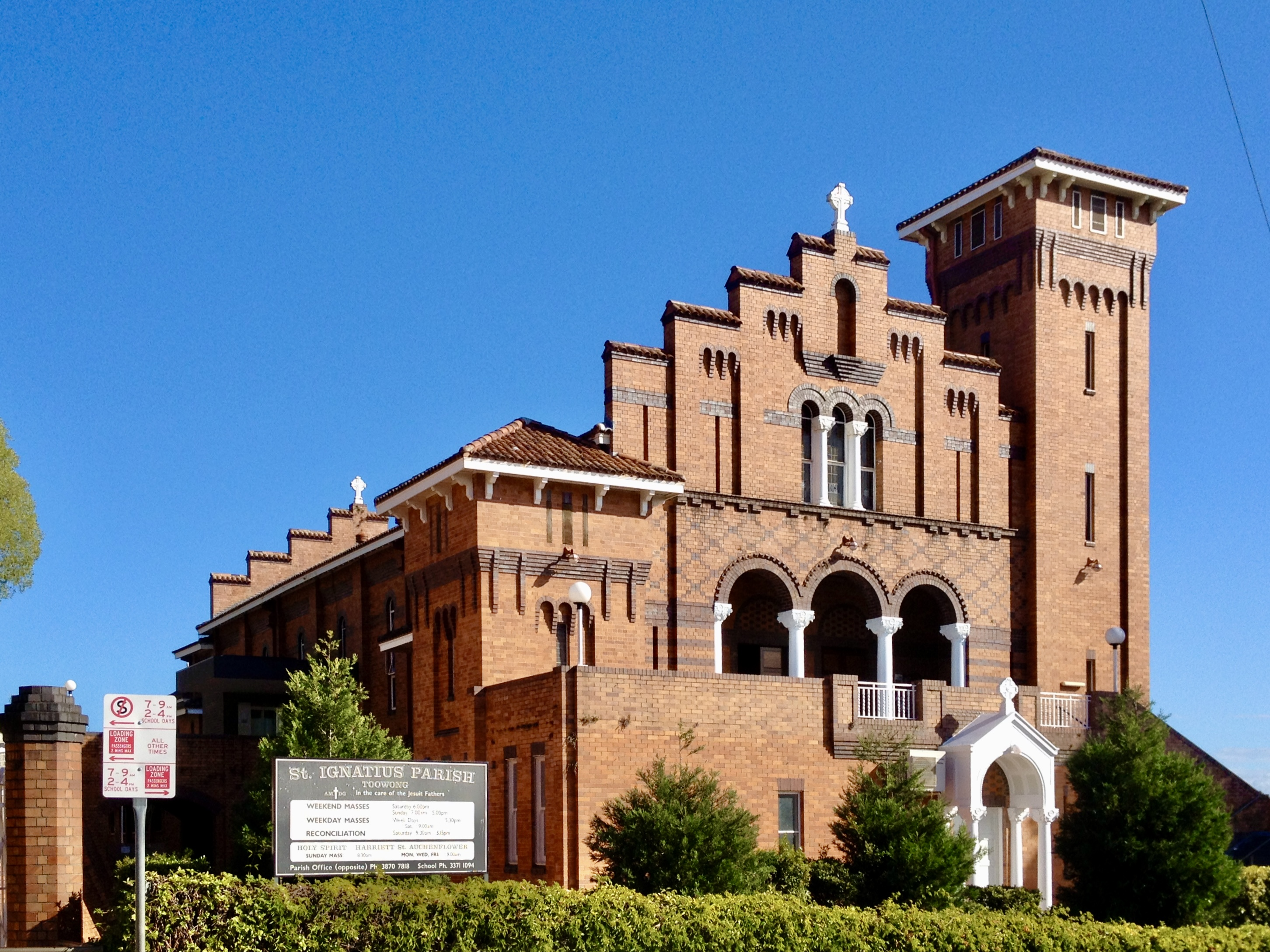
- Church from Kensington Terrace, 2014
- Church of Saint Ignatius Loyola
- 27°29′09″S 152°59′13″E
- Address: 46 Grove Street, Toowong, City of Brisbane, Queensland
- Country: Australia
- Denomination: Roman Catholic
- Website: www.stignatiustoowong.org.au

History
- Status: Church
- Founded: 16 June 1929
- Founder: Archbishop James Duhig
- Dedication: St Ignatius Loyola
- Dedicated: 18 May 1930 by Archbishop James Duhig

Architecture
- Functional status: Active
- Architect: Jack Hennessy, junior
- Architectural type: Church
- Style: Romanesque Revival
- Years built: 1929–1936

Specifications
- Materials: Brick, terracotta tile, fibrous cement sheeting

Administration
- Archdiocese: Brisbane
- Parish: St Ignatius Parish, Toowong

Clergy
- Priest: Fr Wrex Woolnough

Queensland Heritage Register
- Official name: Church of Saint Ignatius Loyola
- Type: State heritage (built, landscape)
- Designated: 12 July 2005
- Reference no.: 602532
- Significant period: 1930s (historical); 1930s (fabric) ongoing (social)
- Significant components: Furniture/fittings, decorative finishes, wall/s – retaining, views from, stained glass window/s, church hall/sunday school hall, church, tower, views to
- Builders: Concrete Construction (QLD) Limited

The Church of Saint Ignatius Loyola is a heritage-listed Roman Catholic church at 46 Grove Street, Toowong, City of Brisbane, Queensland, Australia. It was designed by architect Jack Hennessy, junior, and built from 1929 to 1936 by Concrete Construction (QLD) Limited. It was added to the Queensland Heritage Register on 12 July 2005.

== History ==
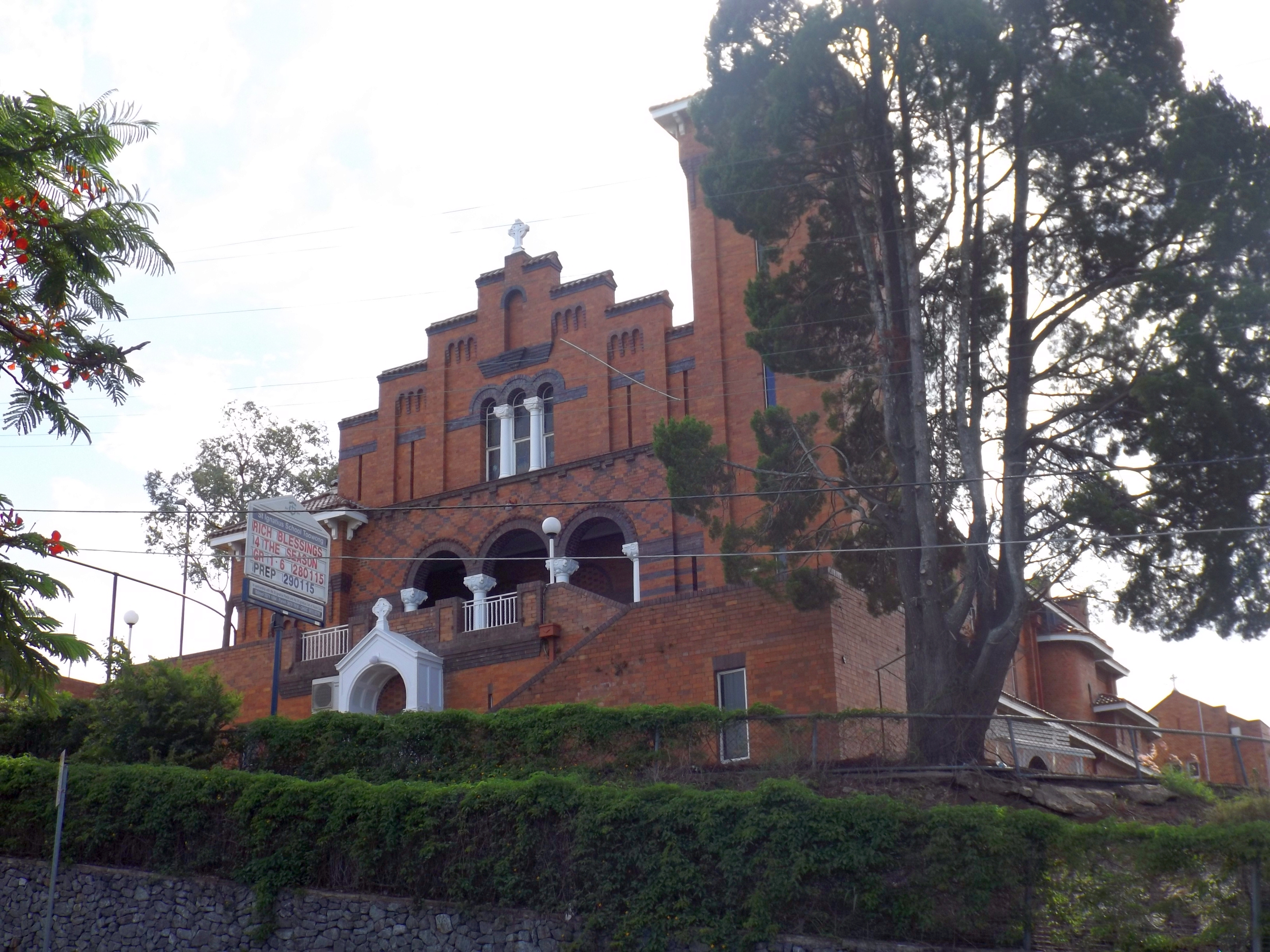
View from Grove Street, 2014

The Church of Saint Ignatius Loyola at Toowong was opened in 1930 and is a Romanesque Revival building designed by Sydney architect, Jack Hennessy, junior. It was constructed as part of Archbishop James Duhig's vision for the development of the Church in Brisbane through a major building program that included several such landmark churches.

=== Early Catholicism in Brisbane ===
Although there was a European settlement at Toowong in the 1860s, the area did not develop until the opening of the Brisbane to Ipswich railway line in 1875 made it readily accessible. A number of villa houses were constructed on large estates on the Toowong ridge, while more modest residences occupied the lower levels. The first St Thomas Church of England opened in 1875, and by 1878, Toowong had enough families to warrant a provisional school.

In 1879, the first Catholic Mass was celebrated at Toowong in a private home, as there was no church in the area. Catholics living in the area attended St Stephen's Cathedral in the Brisbane central business district. In 1888, Archbishop Robert Dunne purchased land in Holland Street below the site of the present church, and on 9 April 1893, the new timber church, called St Michael and the Holy Souls, was blessed and opened there.

In 1902, the Sisters of Mercy purchased a large private home, Goldicott, at the top of the hill and took up residence there, naming it Mount St Mary's Convent. They began teaching at the school next to the church in 1903. A tramline from the city opened in 1904 and was soon extended, contributing to the growth of the Toowong area.

In 1912, James Duhig became Dunne's Co-Adjudicator, taking on many of his administrative duties. The first Catholic Brisbane parishes were erected at Coorparoo, Kangaroo Point, South Brisbane, Red Hill and Rosalie, the parish of Toowong being later formed from part of Rosalie. Although Dunne had only encouraged the Sisters of Mercy and the Christian Brothers to establish branches of their orders themselves in Queensland, Duhig was keen to encourage other religious orders in order to expand education. In August 1915, he wrote to Father John Ryan of the Society of Jesus in Sydney in this regard. In 1916, Toowong became the responsibility of the Jesuits, who purchased and enlarged a house near the church for use as a presbytery. It was opened on St Ignatius Loyola Day, 30 July 1916.

By the early 1920s, both church and school were becoming inadequate for the growing congregation, and the distance between convent and school had always been inconvenient for the teaching nuns, so the Sisters of Mercy provided a solution by offering part of their land for a new building. A public meeting was held in November 1928 at which it was suggested that costs could be kept down by building a hall underneath the church and by using it as a school. John Francis (Jack) Hennessy drew up the plans at the end of 1929. His father, also John Hennessy, founder of the Sydney firm of Hennessy and Hennessy, was an ecclesiastical architect who had worked on St Patrick's, Manly and St Joseph's College, Hunters Hill. Duhig met the younger Hennessey when he was Bishop of Rockhampton, and they had become friends. After Duhig became Archbishop of Brisbane, Jack Hennessey received a number of commissions from him. These included the churches of St Agatha, Clayfield (1925), Corpus Christi, Nundah (1926), and St Augustine, Coolangatta (1926). He also designed the ambitious Cathedral of the Holy Name, whose construction commenced but was never completed.

=== Construction commenced ===
The foundation stone for the church was laid on 16 June 1929. Duhig announced at the ceremony that "the days of wooden churches are past" and that he hoped that no more would be built in the city. His vision for the development of the Catholic Church in Queensland included plans for the building of a number of substantial churches to manifest the strength and presence of the Church. Seeking landmark sites, he chose many on hilltops.

The new church was built by Concrete Constructions Ltd and was supervised by Leo Drinan, Hennessy's partner in the Brisbane office. All materials used were of the best quality, and all five altars were designed by H Credington of the Catholic Art Gallery in Melbourne and made in his studios at Carrara in Italy. Andrew Petrie and Sons erected them. Many handsome gifts were bestowed on the church, including altars, statuary and a number of stained glass windows by John Hardman of London and William Bustard, a noted local glass artist who created the "Magnificat" and "Christ the King" windows.

The Architects and Builders Journal of Queensland, in its May edition, predicted that "This building should rank as one of the handsomest churches of its size in Queensland". The Catholic Leader of 22 May 1930 thought that "The Italian Romanesque style of architecture, with the scope for elaborate interior embellishment and bold use of colour, is eminently suitable to the climate of Queensland" and the church indeed has a high quality of interior detailing. This decorative work includes ornate main and side altars, statuary, stained glass, and, in particular, extensive and striking scagliola work to the sanctuary and pulpit.

Scagliola (from scaglia or scales, after the natural form of the mineral used) is an artificial stone created from gypsum plaster, glues, and dyes that can be made to imitate various types of stone, though usually rare types and colours of marble. The best work is visually indistinguishable from genuine marble, though it is far lighter, so that large and complex decorative features, such as the St Ignatius pulpit, can be constructed that would be difficult and costly to create in stone. The technique was developed in Germany and Italy at the end of the 15th century and was used mainly for decorating churches, such as San Miniato al Monte in Florence, Italy. Fine early examples of it also survive in secular buildings such as the Pantheon and Syon House in England. It became popular in America in the 19th century, the work being carried out by itinerant Italian craftsmen, though much was not of good quality.

The art was revived in Australia by the Sydney firm of Melocco Brothers. In 1908, Italian Pietro Melocco arrived in Sydney and began a commission on St Mary's Cathedral, the magnificent decorated floors of which became his life's work. His two brothers joined him, and their firm was responsible for most of Sydney's best mosaic and terrazzo work, though much of this has not survived. For the Government Savings Bank in Martin Place, Tony Melocco decided to use scagliola, a technique by then fallen into disuse. Finding no one in either Italy or America able to teach him, Galli Melocco moved to Brisbane in 1929 to set up a branch of the company, though he returned to Sydney a year later as the Depression reduced the demand for such decorative work. It is not known if any major scagliola project other than that at St Ignatius Church was carried out in Queensland.

The church was blessed and opened by Archbishop Duhig on the 18 May 1930 and dedicated to St Ignatius Loyola, the founder of the Society of Jesus. Its cost of £16,010 included excavations, seating, lighting, decoration and fittings. The old church was relocated to Graceville, where it remains.

=== Subsequent works ===
Between 1933 and 1936, a number of works were carried out by Depression relief labour. Kensington Terrace was excavated, and the land on the southern side of the church was excavated to provide better access. The spoil was used to reclaim land along the northern side of the church, which is now used as a car park.

The hall under the church did not prove suitable for long-term use as a school, as it was too small and could not be divided into separate classrooms. On 3 November 1946, the foundation stone of a new school was laid to the west of the church. It was opened on 18 July 1948 and has been extended in several stages in the late 20th century.

Father Leo Murphy, assistant priest at St Ignatius since 1942, died in 1957 and a fund was set up to purchase a pipe organ as a memorial to him and in accordance with the instructions of Pope Pius XII who had ruled that a pipe organ was the approved instrument for use during the liturgy and to accompany singing. The organ was constructed by Whitehouse at a cost of £2050 and was installed on 2 February and blessed on 8 March 1959.

The Sanctuary was paved with marble in February 1963, and new lighting was installed in the church and hall. Following changes recommended by the Second Vatican Council, the first Mass at St Ignatius facing the people was held in 1966. A silky oak communion table was constructed for this purpose and donated by parishioner Frank Shuttlewood and his wife. The baptismal font of carved Carrara marble has been moved from the Baptistery to the front of the church, and the confessional booths on either side of the rear of the church appear now to be used for storage.

== Description ==
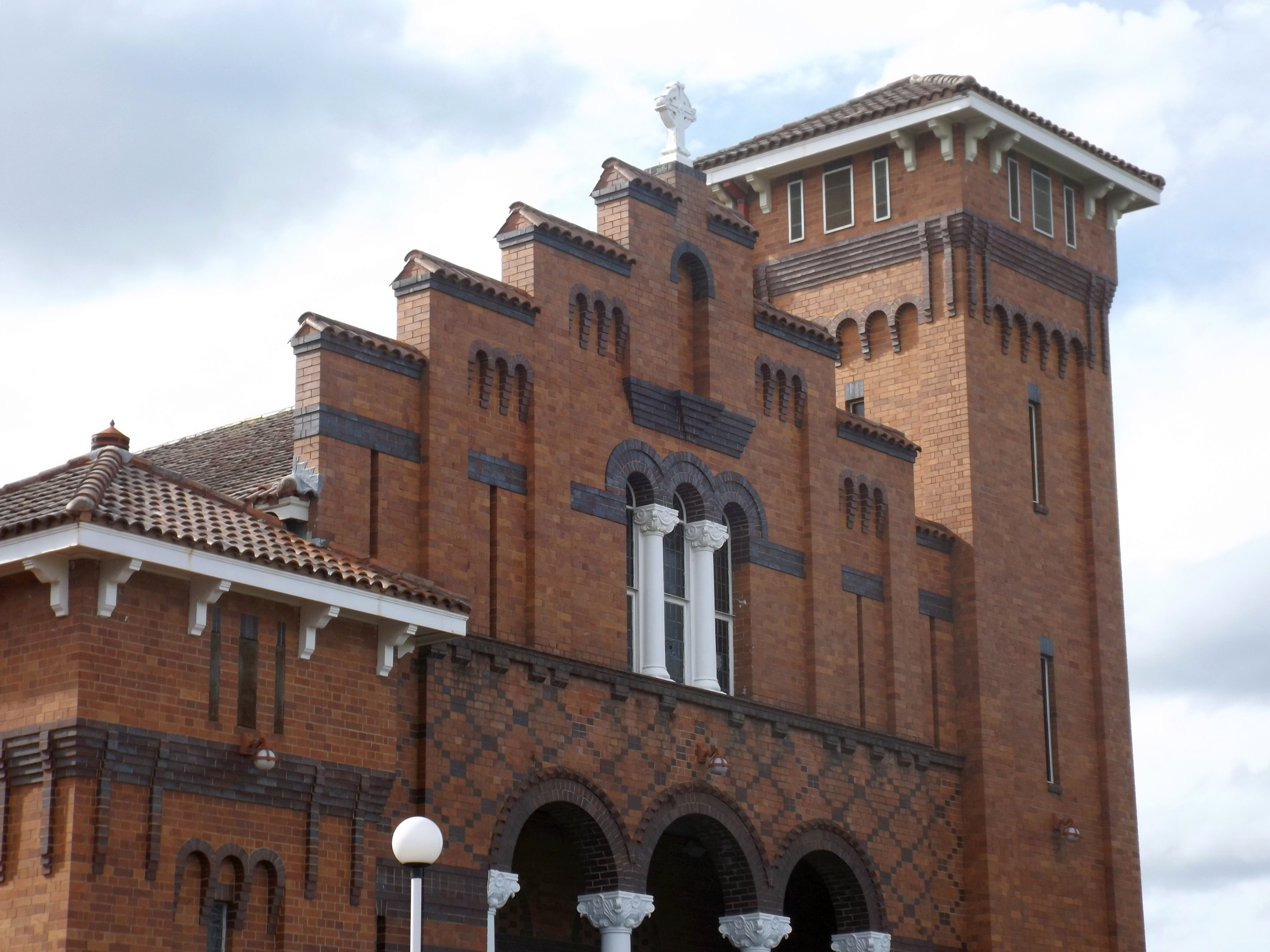
Parapet, 2014

The Church of St Ignatius Loyola is a brick Romanesque building cut into a steeply sloping site on Toowong ridge. It commands a fine prospect across the city, and its prominent position and square bell tower make it a landmark. It is a two-storey building with a hall on the lower level and the church proper on the upper level.

The church has an asymmetric front with a stepped parapet and is constructed of decorative polychrome brickwork in orange and brown. The roof is clad in Roman terracotta tiles. The upper level is accessed by steps to a large terrace at the eastern end. It is cruciform in plan with a long nave and short transepts terminating in small chapels, on the northern side, accessing an elaborate scagliola pulpit. Doors on the southern side are accessed by bridges that extend from a raised walkway.

The ceiling is clad in fibrous cement sheeting with lattice vents, and there is a choir loft faced with silky oak panelling above the eastern entrance, which contains the organ. Below this, on either side of the entrance, are altars, and in the wall on each side are the doors to confessional booths, now used for storage.

Panels depicting the Stations of the Cross are set into the walls of the nave, and at the western end is an apsidal chancel with vestries and a sanctuary approached through arches clad in orange-veined scagliola and lined with the same material. The floors are concrete and are paved with marble in the Sanctuary.

The lower floor has separate entrances and contains a large hall with a stage at the eastern end and a kitchen. There is an arcaded verandah along the northern side.

Directly behind the church, and a few metres from it, is a brick school constructed on a similar scale, which is not considered to have heritage significance.

== Heritage listing ==
The Church of Saint Ignatius Loyola was listed on the Queensland Heritage Register on 12 July 2005, having satisfied the following criteria.

The place is important in demonstrating the evolution or pattern of Queensland's history.

The Church of Saint Ignatius Loyola is important as evidence for the period of expansion of the Catholic Church in Queensland during the 1920s and 30s under the leadership of Archbishop James Duhig. It is one of the churches, substantial in fabric and notable for the quality of design and finish, which were intended to demonstrate and encourage a strong Catholic presence in the diocese. It is a manifestation of the Catholic ethos of selecting imposing sites to produce prominent landmarks and is a characteristic of churches built during the time of Archbishop Duhig.

The place demonstrates rare, uncommon or endangered aspects of Queensland's cultural heritage.

The Church of Saint Ignatius Loyola is rare for its extensive use of scagliola for the sanctuary and pulpit, which may be the only example of such use in Queensland.

The place is important in demonstrating the principal characteristics of a particular class of cultural places.

The Church of Saint Ignatius Loyola is a particularly good example of an inter-war church, influenced by the fashionable revival of Romanesque church architecture in Australia, with its tower, picturesque massing and polychrome brickwork, a style favoured by Archbishop Duhig.

The place is important because of its aesthetic significance.

The Church of Saint Ignatius Loyola has high aesthetic value as a well-designed and visually pleasing building on a landmark site. The interior is notable for the quality of its fittings and finishes, including glass, altars, statuary, and the use of scagliola for wall cladding and arches to the sanctuary and the ornate pulpit.

The place has a strong or special association with a particular community or cultural group for social, cultural, or spiritual reasons.

As a parish church and formerly a school, it has been important for several generations of Catholics in the surrounding area as a source of spiritual, social, and educational sustenance.

The place has a special association with the life or work of a particular person, group or organisation of importance in Queensland's history.

The Church of Saint Ignatius Loyola has special associations with the life and works of Archbishop James Duhig and the architect John Francis Hennessey and with the work of the Society of Jesus in Queensland.

== See also ==
- List of Jesuit sites
