= Corpus Christi Church, Nundah =

Church in Brisbane, Queensland, Australia

Corpus Christi Church
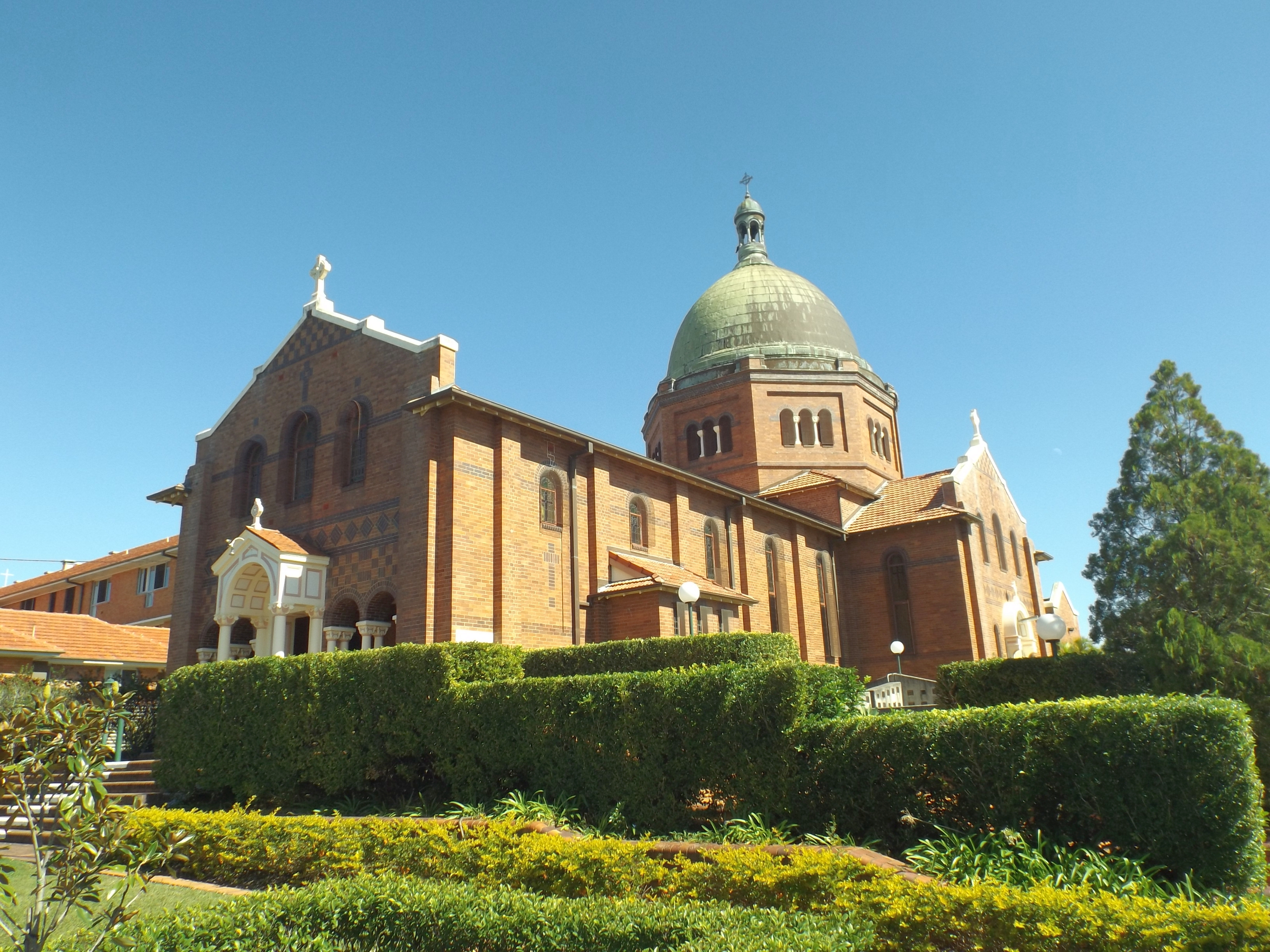
- Corpus Christi Church and gardens in 2015
- Corpus Christi Church
- 27°24′14″S 153°03′27″E
- Address: 65 Bage Street, Nundah, City of Brisbane, Queensland
- Country: Australia
- Denomination: Roman Catholic
- Website: www.banyonundahcatholic.org.au

History
- Status: Church
- Founded: 14 June 1925
- Consecrated: 21 November 1926

Architecture
- Functional status: Active
- Architect(s): Hennessey, Hennessey, Keesing and Co
- Architectural type: Church
- Style: Romanesque Revival
- Years built: 1925–1926
- Construction cost: £16,840

Specifications
- Materials: Brick, terracotta tiles, copper-sheeted dome

Administration
- Archdiocese: Brisbane
- Parish: Banyo Nundah

Clergy
- Priest: Fr Dan Redhead

Queensland Heritage Register
- Official name: Corpus Christi Church
- Type: State heritage (landscape, built)
- Designated: 6 July 1995
- Reference no.: 601460
- Significant period: 1920s (historical); 1920s (fabric) ongoing (social)
- Significant components: Views to, furniture/fittings, views from, confessional, trees/plantings, church, garden/grounds, dome
- Builders: Stanley Samuel Carrick

Corpus Christi Church is a heritage-listed Roman Catholic church at 65 Bage Street, Nundah, City of Brisbane, Queensland, Australia. It was designed by Hennessey, Hennessey, Keesing and Co and built from 1925 to 1926 by Stanley Samuel Carrick. It was added to the Queensland Heritage Register on 6 July 1995.

== History ==
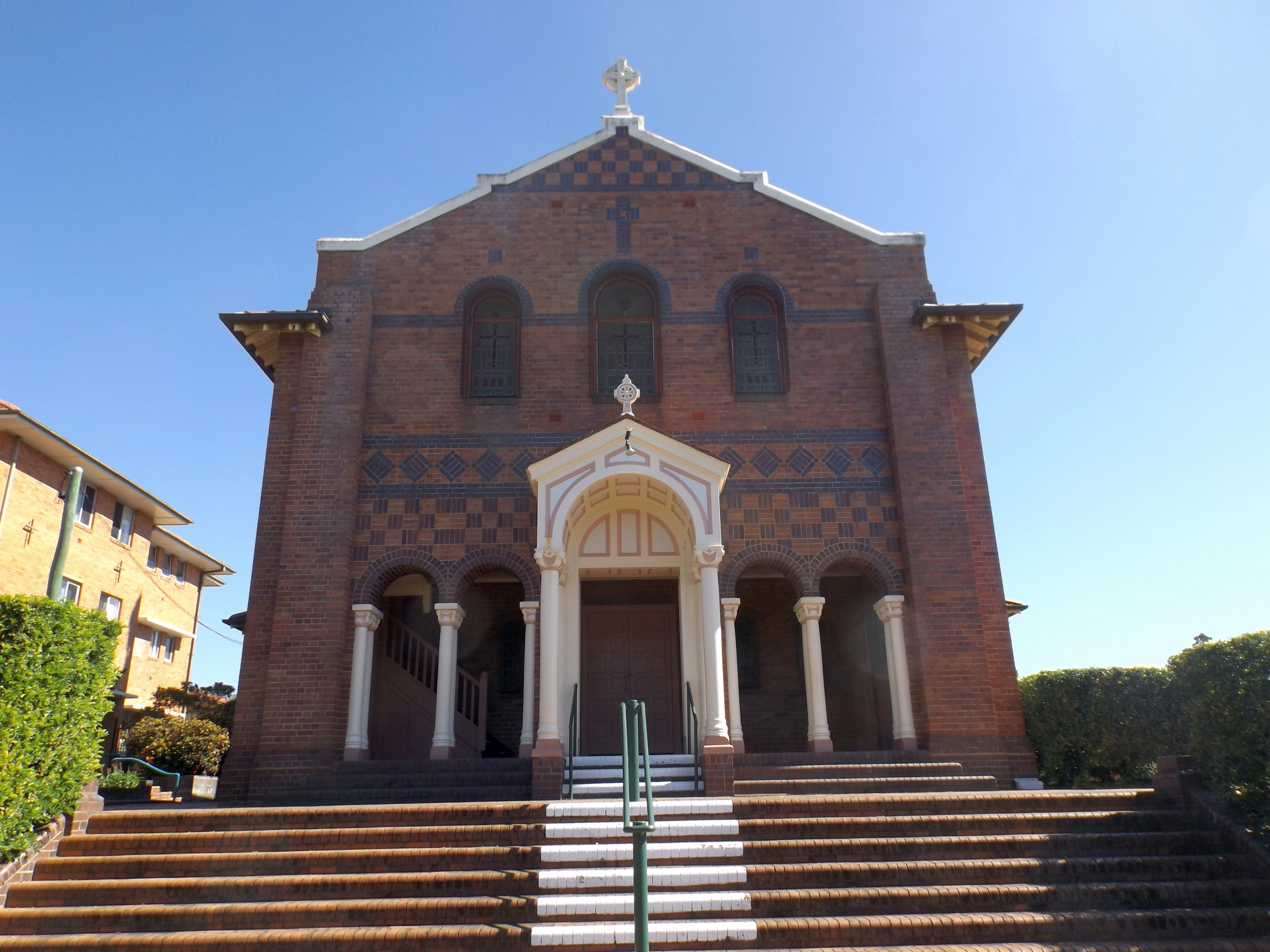
Church entrance, 2015

The Corpus Christi Church was constructed in 1925–1926, for the Roman Catholic parish at Nundah, who formerly practiced in a small timber church on another site. The church was constructed under the guidance of the then Archbishop James Duhig, who promoted Catholic presence in Brisbane by exploiting prominent sites, to produce landmarks. Corpus Christi may have been designed as a scale model for the Holy Name Cathedral which was in the planning stages at this time. The architects for the project were Hennessey, Hennessey, Keesing and Co.

Settlement in the Nundah area began with a Moravian mission set up for Aborigines in the area in 1838. Although the mission was closed by 1848 many of the missionaries and their families remained in the Nundah area. In the 1860s a strong German presence was felt in the area, particularly as a result of immigration. The first Lutheran and Methodist services in Queensland were held in Nundah.

It was not until 1903 that the catholic community in the area, who attended church at Wooloowin, Sandgate, or inner city areas, met to discuss the construction of a church. On 19 June 1904 Archbishop Robert Dunne blessed The Church of the Real Presence, and spoke of the momentous occasion, which saw the opening of a Catholic church in what was the birthplace of Protestantism in Queensland. The church cost £600, which was paid off before the opening and was located on the corner of Duke Street and Buckland Road.

A strong Catholic presence in Nundah by 1915, dictated the need for a school, and the Sisters of St Joseph of the Sacred Heart were asked to join the parish, to open this school. Previously, property in the area had been purchased by the church as a more suitable church site, due to its position on the crest of a hill. The property previously belonged to a Mr Henry Donkin who had constructed a large house, Marsten, which was used by the sisters as the first school and convent.

A presbytery was built on the grounds of Marsten, soon after 1920, when the Rev Archbishop James Duhig became the registered owner. The first parish priest was Father Jordan, who stayed with the Nundah parish until 1941. Previously, priests cycled from the Wooloowin presbytery to say mass in the small timber church. A site was chosen on the grounds near the school and presbytery for a more imposing church.

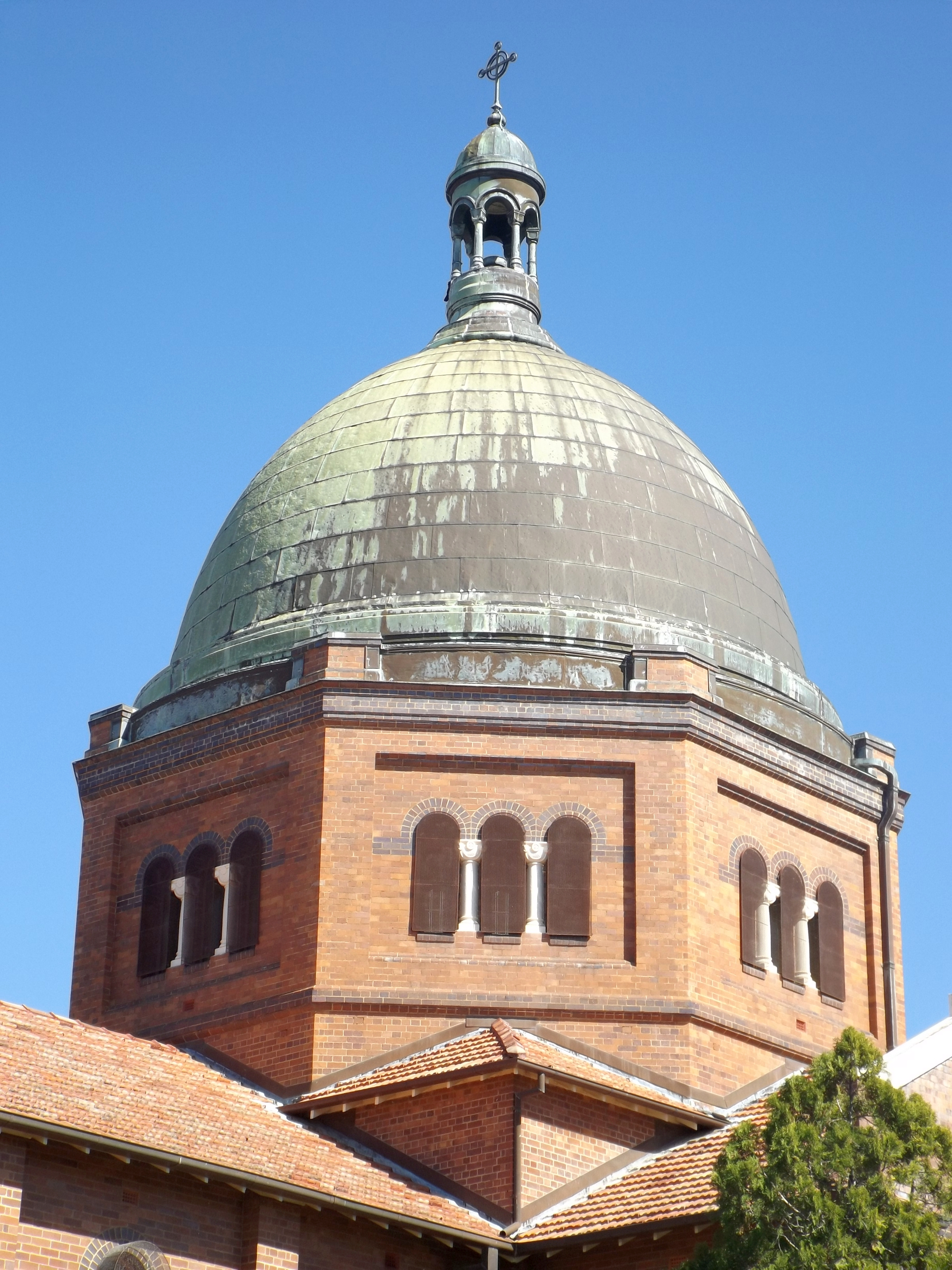
Church dome, 2015

It was part of Duhig's grand plan for the development of the Catholic Church in Brisbane that a number of churches be built to manifest the strength of the church. Many of the sites Duhig sought were on hill tops. By 1940, when Duhig had been controlling the estate for twenty-eight years, forty-six new churches in Brisbane had been built since 1912, including St Joseph's at Kangaroo Point, Church of Saint Ignatius Loyola at Toowong and St Agatha's at Clayfield. Duhig favoured certain architects, particular the designers of Corpus Christi, Hennessey and Hennessey, who planned the ill-fated Holy Name Cathedral with the Archbishop. Duhig felt that the construction of churches enhanced the catholic presence and signified the strength and wealth of the church.

Corpus Christi Church was planned to be a golden link in the chain of churches around Brisbane. Some sources state that it was a scale model for the Holy Name Cathedral, which was planned for a site in Ann Street, across the street from All Hallows' School. The design of both of these Hennessey and Hennessey buildings was thought to be reminiscent of St. Peter's Basilica in Rome, which has the characteristic dome, surmounted by a lantern and cross.

The laying of the foundation stone of the Corpus Christi Church on 14 June 1925 attracted 20,000 people, who donated £2000 to the construction of the church, although the church was not fully paid off until the 1940s.

The church was designed by Hennessey, Hennessey, Keesing and Co, architects in Sydney, Brisbane and Melbourne. Jack Hennessy, junior had recently completed the additions to St Mary's Cathedral in Sydney, and was a friend and colleague of the archbishop at the time. The work was completed by local contractor, Stanley Samuel Carrick, for a total cost of £16,840. Corpus Christi Church was opened on 21 November 1926 in a ceremony which saw eight tiers of lights illuminating the dome.

The original house, Marsten was demolished in 1959 to make way for a new convent. The church remains intact with very little alteration.

== Description ==
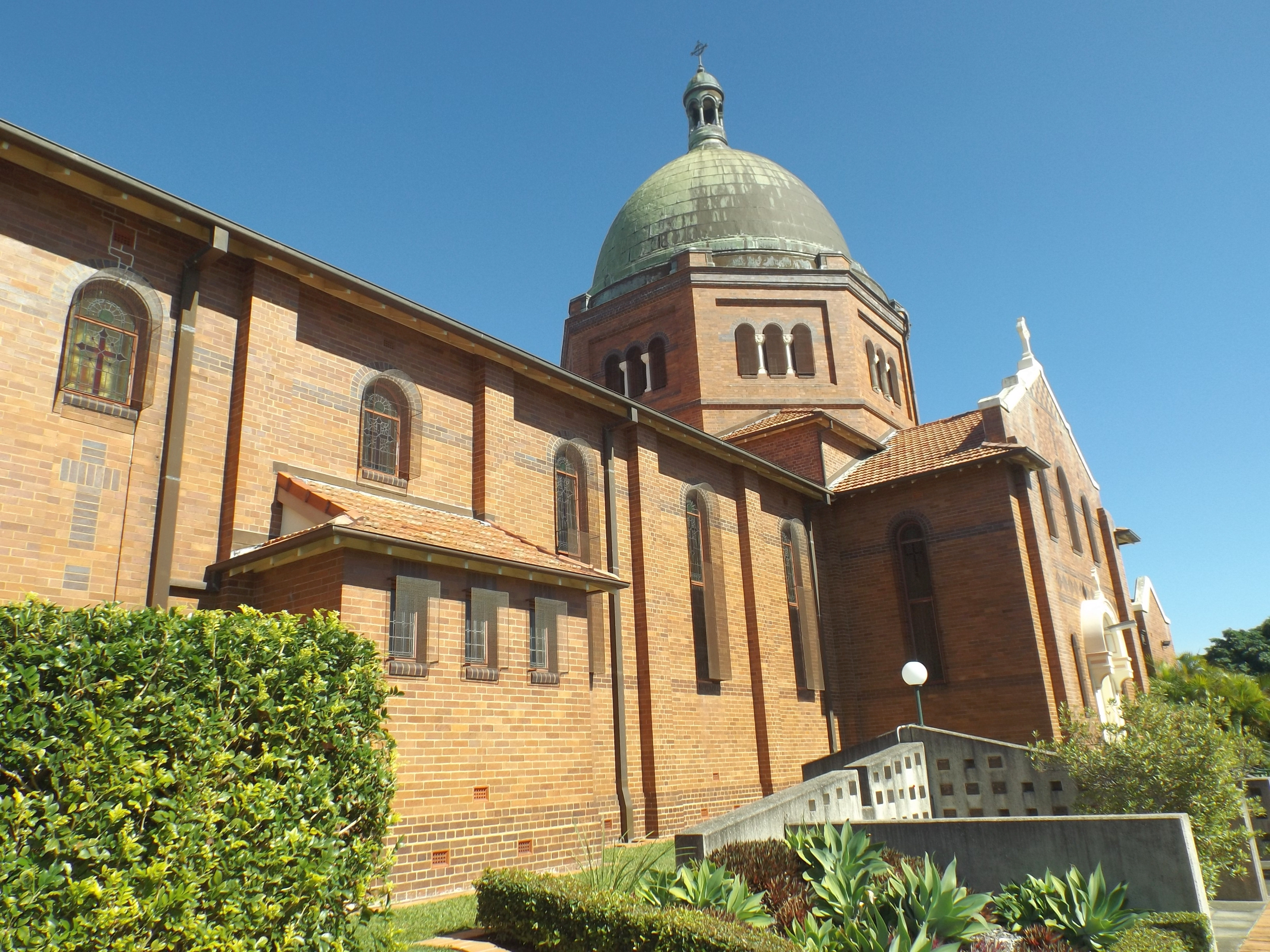
Side of the building, 2015

Corpus Christi Church is a brick building situated on the crest of a hill, in Bage Street, Nundah, with expansive views to the north and east. The design of the church was influenced by the Romanesque Revival style, in its massing and detailing. Several large trees and established gardens surround the building.

Corpus Christi Church is a symmetrically composed, polychrome brick building, with traditional Latin Cross plan and a polygonal chancel extending from the western end. The terracotta tiled roof, is gabled over the front and two transept entrances and hipped over the chancel. The dominant feature of the church is the copper sheeted dome, which extends about 100 feet (30 m) above ground level above the junction of the transepts and nave. Surmounted on the dome is an octagonal lantern, with a Celtic cross finial. The dome rests on an octagonal drum, supported square planned arcade. The drum, of polychrome brick, features tripartite arched window openings on each of the eight faces.

The church features polychrome brickwork patterning, including chequer pattern banding on the gables, banding on external columns, dark brick quoining and a dark brick plinth. The external walls are buttressed with shallow attached piers.

The eastern elevation features an open portal, with a vaulted covering sheltered by a gabled awning, supported on coupled columns, featuring plaster cast capitals and bases. The portal opens onto an arcaded entrance porch, defined by similar columns, from which a closed timber quarter turn stair runs to the gallery. Panelled timber doors open off the entrance bay to the church. Above the portal are three round headed arched window openings, glazed with leadlight.

The entrances to the north and south transepts are similar to the main eastern entrance, but with vaulted awnings supported on moulded corbels. The western facade has a brick arcaded verandah echoing the octagonally shaped chancel.

Internally the church is dominated by the coffered interior of the dome at the intersection of the nave and transepts. This is supported on four wide arches, which span the internal width of the church, one of which forms the chancel arch. The chancel features an ornate marble altar and a large Italian painting. Flanking the chancel are two side chapels with religious statues. Unusually, a marble altar rail has survived, as have two confessional bays on the north and south walls. A gallery sits over the eastern end of the interior, with a large Whitehouse Brothers pipe organ. The interior is carpeted and has rendered brick walls with a timber boarded ceiling.

== Heritage listing ==
Corpus Christi Church was listed on the Queensland Heritage Register on 6 July 1995 having satisfied the following criteria.

The place is important in demonstrating the evolution or pattern of Queensland's history.

The Corpus Christi Church was built during a time of expansion of the Catholic Church in Queensland during Archbishop Duhig's time, when an effort was made to create a strong Catholic presence, particularly in those areas of traditional Protestant dominance.

The design of Corpus Christi is significant as it paralleled the design of the ill-fated Holy Name Cathedral and may have been planned as a scale model for the cathedral. The Corpus Christi Church is a manifestation of the Catholic ethos of exploiting imposing sites to produce prominent landmarks. This is particularly true of churches built during the time of Archbishop James Duhig.

The place is important because of its aesthetic significance.

The church is a particularly good example of an inter-war church, influenced by the fashionable Romanesque revival of church architecture in Australia, with its feature dome, picturesque massing and polychrome brickwork, a style favoured by Archbishop Duhig.

The place has a strong or special association with a particular community or cultural group for social, cultural or spiritual reasons.

It is symbolically important to the catholic parish of Nundah.

The place has a special association with the life or work of a particular person, group or organisation of importance in Queensland's history.

The church has special associations with Archbishop James Duhig and the architects Hennessey and Hennessey.
