= Colonial Mutual =

Australian financial services company

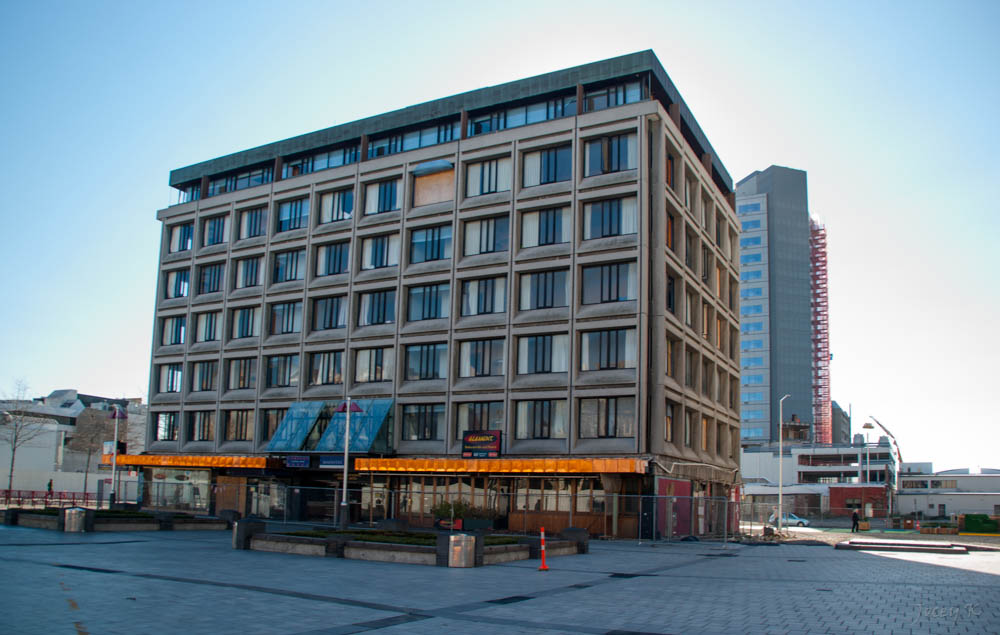
- CML building, Christchurch
- Formerly: Colonial Mutual Life Assurance Society Limited
- Industry: Financial services
- Genre: Bancassurance or allfinanz
- Founded: 1873
- Founder: Sir Redmond Barry
- Defunct: 2000
- Fate: Acquired by Commonwealth Bank
- Successor: Colonial First State
- Headquarters: Melbourne, Victoria, Australia
- Area served: Oceania; Asia; United Kingdom
- Services: Life insurance; General insurance; Retirement savings; Banking and funds management

The Colonial Mutual Life Assurance Society Limited, later Colonial Limited, and commonly known as Colonial Mutual, Colonial Mutual Life, and/or CML, was a diverse international financial services company headquartered in Melbourne, Australia. Colonial's core businesses were life and general insurance, retirement savings, banking and funds management. The company operated in the United Kingdom, New Zealand and Fiji for more than a century.

It was a mutual society for most of its history, and demutualised in 1997. In 1994, Colonial acquired the State Bank of New South Wales, including the bank's First State investment management business. Colonial was acquired by Commonwealth Bank in 2000. The Colonial name lives on in the Colonial First State, which was until 2021 a subsidiary of the Commonwealth Bank.

== History ==
Colonial was founded in Melbourne in 1873. The first President of the Society was Redmond Barry.

In the 1980s, Jacques Martin was established to provide administration and consulting services to rapidly expanding corporate and industry-based retirement funds. In 1989, financial advisers became a feature of the business through the purchase of Scottish Amicable’s interests in Australia. Colonial expanded its operations into Asia in 1990 and its presence in the region comprised almost 130 offices across eight markets.

In 1994, banking became a major platform of the group’s business when Colonial acquired the State Bank of New South Wales. Funds management was a key sector of Colonial’s operations since the company was established, and this business was further expanded when Colonial acquired First State Fund Managers (now Colonial First State Investments) as part of the agreement to buy the Bank. In 1997 Colonial’s stockbroking arm was established.

Colonial listed on the Australian and New Zealand stock exchanges in 1997, ending 124 years as a mutual company and beginning a new era as a publicly owned company.

Colonial carved out a position for itself in the financial services sector. Its aim was to achieve growth and balance risk across a diverse range of income streams, drawn from its wide but complementary range of business operations and its broad geographic exposure.

In 2000, Colonial Mutual was acquired by the Commonwealth Bank and became part of Colonial First State.

Colonial was differentiated in the marketplace through its fundamental strategy known as bancassurance or ‘allfinanz’, the provision of a broad range of integrated solutions to its customers’ lifelong financial needs. These financial solutions were delivered through innovative methods of distribution that are most convenient and relevant to customers’ individual needs. The allfinanz approach was most highly developed in Australia, and it was progressively being exported to Colonial’s international operations in ways that reflect the local market conditions and opportunities.

== Overseas activities ==
The company entered Asia in 1990 under the brand ‘CMG’ and now has a presence in the region spanning eight markets. The group’s operations in Hong Kong, Singapore and the Philippines are wholly owned. In other key markets CMH has forged joint ventures with Edaran Otomobil Nasional Berhad (EON) in Malaysia, the Bank of Ayudhya family of companies in Thailand, PT Astra International in Indonesia, and The Ho Chi Minh City Insurance Company (Bao Minh) in Vietnam.

Colonial signed a joint venture contract with China Life Insurance Company to establish a life insurance business in Shanghai.

China The company has operated representative offices in Beijing since 1994 and in Shanghai since 1995. In April 1998, Colonial became the first Australian insurer to be invited by the Government of the People’s Republic of China to apply for a licence to set up a life insurance business in Shanghai. A joint venture with China’s largest life insurer China Life was announced on 30 July 1999. The group was also active in investments in China. It has established a joint venture company – CMG Mahon Investments – a direct equity fund to invest directly into businesses in less developed regions of China. It also manages and part owns CMG CH China Investments Limited, a fund that invests exclusively in equities listed on the Shanghai and Shenzhen stock exchanges.

Fiji Islands Colonial offered life insurance, health insurance, banking and investments in Fiji. It leads the Fiji life and health insurance markets, with around a 70 per cent share of the local life insurance market by premium income. It became active in banking in Fiji when it acquired a 51 per cent stake in the National Bank of Fiji (now Colonial National Bank) in early 1999.

Hong Kong CMG was the fifth largest life insurance business in Hong Kong (by new business) and offers life insurance, retirement savings and credit card services to retail and corporate clients. The product range also includes personal accident, hospital and surgical expenses benefits; disability income; and group medical insurance. Investments are also offered through the group’s international funds management business, CMG First State Investments. CMG offers a comprehensive range of pension products, administration and investment services for the Hong Kong Mandatory Provident Fund.

Indonesia Colonial had been in a joint venture with PT Astra International, since 1992. Astra CMG has almost 1500 staff and agents in 30 locations offering life insurance products and services for individual and corporate clients.

Malaysia Colonial entered a joint venture with EON in 1995, establishing EON CMG Life. The company currently employs 1200 staff and agents and has offices in seven key locations across Malaysia including in Peninsula Malaysia, Sabah and Sarawak.

New Zealand

Colonial currently offers term life insurance, retirement savings, income protection, trauma and disability cover, funds management and administration. The New Zealand insurance distribution network includes preferred agents, financial planners and brokers, in conjunction with Colonial’s franchised outlets.

Singapore In Singapore, CMG First State Investments offers a mix between retail and wholesale products and experienced staff and management.

Thailand Ayudhya CMG Life was Thailand’s third largest insurance company (by new business). A full product range – including family protection and retirement planning products, investments, employee benefits and health care – was offered to individual and corporate clients. The company has almost 7000 staff and agents in approximately 80 branches.

The Philippines In the Philippines, CMG employs more than 2800 staff and agents, offering corporate and individual clients life, personal accident and medical insurance. The head office was in Manila with a further 19 offices in major cities throughout the country.

United Kingdom Colonial’s international funds management business was represented in the UK market through Colonial Stewart Ivory Investments. The international equities operations of Colonial First State Investments are centralised in the UK, taking advantage of its position as a key global financial centre.

Vietnam In 1999, Colonial was awarded the first Vietnamese licence for a life insurance joint venture between a local and international company. This followed the signing earlier that year of a joint venture agreement with the Ho Chi Minh City Insurance Company (Bao Minh). The joint venture, Bao Minh CMG, was based in Ho Chi Minh City and commenced selling life insurance policies in March 2000.
