= RS Exton and Co Building =

Heritage-listed building in Brisbane, Queensland

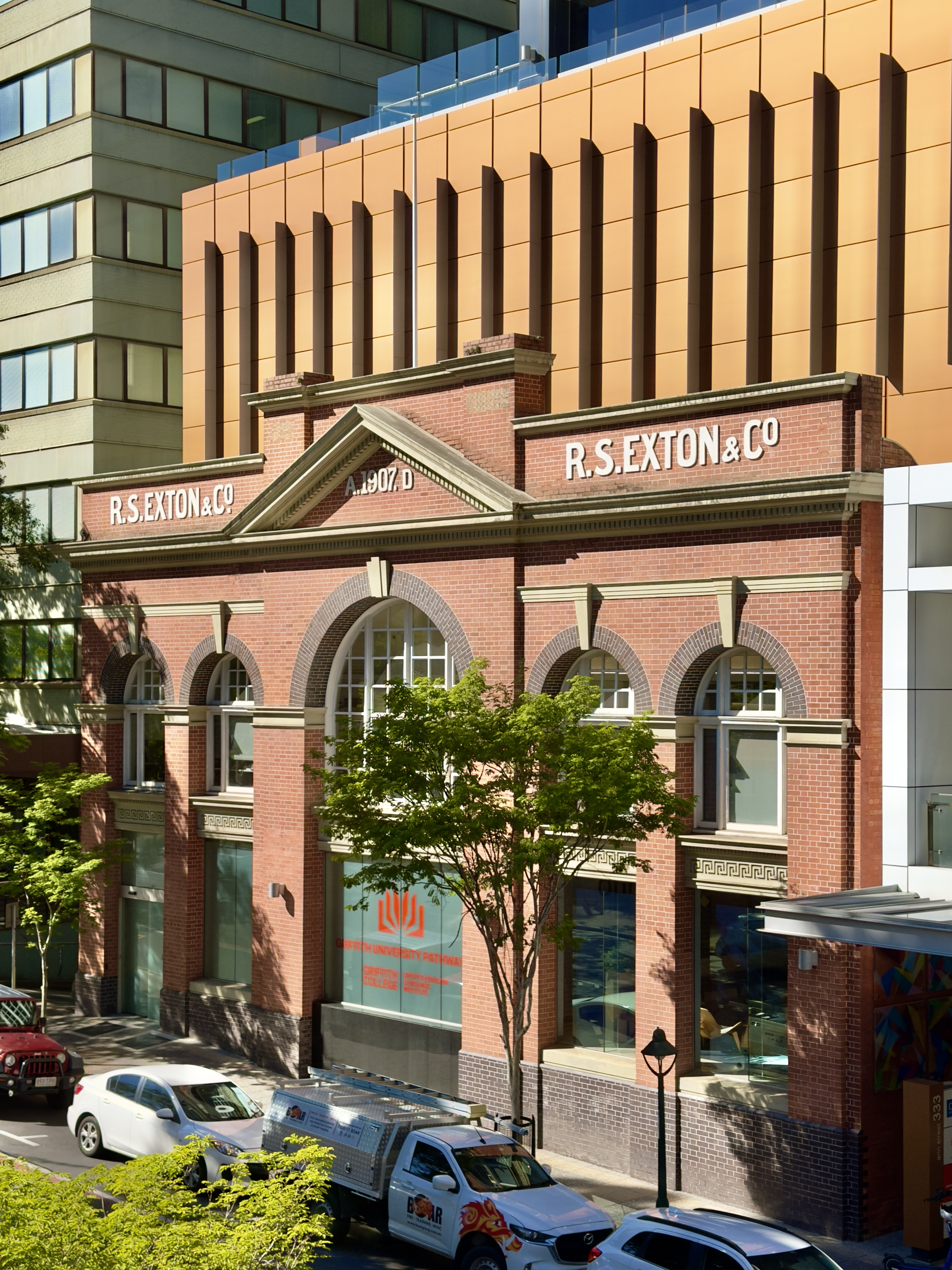
- RS Exton and Co Building in 2026

- Location within Queensland Location within Australia
- 27.4648°S 153.0283°E
- Location: 333 Ann Street, Brisbane City, City of Brisbane, Queensland, Australia

History
- Design period: 1900–1914 (early 20th century)
- Built: 1907

Site notes
- Architect: Claude William Chambers

Queensland Heritage Register
- Official name: Former RS Exton and Co Building (Part), Ace House
- Type: state heritage (built)
- Designated: 17 December 1999
- Reference no.: 601142
- Significant period: 1900s (fabric); 1907–1940s (historical use)

RS Exton and Co Building is a heritage-listed warehouse facade at 333 Ann Street, Brisbane City, City of Brisbane, Queensland, Australia. It was designed by Claude William Chambers and built in 1907. It is also known as Ace House. It was added to the Queensland Heritage Register on 17 December 1999.

== History ==
The former RS Exton and Co Building was constructed in 1907 as the premises of the renowned painters and decorators, RS Exton and Co. The warehouse was designed by Brisbane architect, Claude W Chambers. Recently, the building was partially demolished and the facade only survives.

Robert Skerrett Exton was a prolific painter, decorator and glazier who practiced in Brisbane from 1882 until 1921. In 1882 Robert Skerrit Exton established a painting and decorating partnership with George Gough. Both men were from Lincolnshire, England. Exton arrived in Brisbane and in the 1870s established himself as a glazier in Harcourt Street, Fortitude Valley. By 1880 Exton had moved to premises at 337–9 Queen Street, Brisbane.

In 1882 the partnership of Exton and Gough allowed an expansion of Exton's solo concern. George Gough was a painter and decorator of many years experience. In 1883 the partnership moved from Exton's earlier premises to 526 Queen Street, opposite Petrie Bight. The partnership continued here and with branches in Toowoomba and Rockhampton until 1907 when it dissolved.

Typical of most painters and decorators of the nineteenth and earlier twentieth centuries, Exton and Gough and their employees provided a wide range of services for the householder or business person building or improving their premises. Services included painting and decorating, and signwriting. Exton and Gough also provided paint supplies for tradesmen and were agents for embossed metal ceilings and importers of art glass and wallpapers of the latest European design. During the 1880s Exton and Gough expanded their business to incorporate a department for the manufacture of stained glass, the only of its kind in Queensland.

Exton and Gough quickly assumed a reputation for high quality work and were commissioned for prestigious projects including Government House (George Street), the Treasury Building, Customs House, the Smellie and Co Warehouse, the Wesleyan Methodist Churches in Brisbane and Fortitude Valley. Exton and Gough provided stained glass windows for St Stephen's Cathedral and St Patrick's Church in Fortitude Valley. During the 20th century, Exton worked on the Brisbane City Hall and the Regent Theatre.

Following the dissolution of the Exton and Gough partnership, RS Exton and Co was formed and George Gough established a separate painting and decorating business in Albert Street. RS Exton constructed a building at 333 Ann Street to continue business. Robert Skerrett Exton acquired the title for the land on 17 April 1907. Exton and Arthur Hatton, an associate, obtained a mortgage on the property in December 1907 for $1000 with a time frame of just over 2 years to repay the loan. The Ann Street property was transferred to RS Exton and Co on 5 December 1910 when RS Exton and Co became a limited company and Robert Skerrett Exton, Arthur Joseph Hatton, William Exton and Robert Harold Exton were appointed as the directors.

The warehouse is thought to be designed by Brisbane architect Claude W Chambers, as the RS Exton and Co Warehouse appears in the list of completed buildings in an advertisement for Chambers in Queenslanders As We See 'Em of 1915. When constructed the building's face brick facade was symmetrically arranged around a central round arched full length recess flanked by narrower double arched recesses. Greek key relief moulding on cement panels, signage and other classical motifs decorated the facade.

The choice of Ann Street, as the site of the RS Exton and Co Warehouse was in accord with other early twentieth-century business who maintained businesses in the Street. At the time RS Exton and Co constructed its warehouse, this area of Ann Street had been transformed with the construction of the Central railway station in the late 1880s; a number of hotels including the Canberra Hotel and the Oxford Hotel were established nearby along with a number of businesses and churches. Immediately adjacent to the RS Exton and Co Warehouse was J Simmonds Monumental Works, located adjacent to St Andrews Presbyterian Church on the corner of Creek and Ann Streets. Subsequent to the construction of the RS Exton and Co Warehouse, the Masonic Temple, Shell House, the Government ANZAC Square Offices, the People's Palace, the City Hall and other hotels and businesses were constructed in Ann Street. Ann Street, a series of two to four storeyed buildings built to the footpath and punctuated occasionally with towers became a significant promenade through Brisbane. Since the 1960s, many of these earlier buildings have been demolished and replaced with multi storeyed office buildings.

RS Exton and Co continued to offer painting and decorating services and expanded the stained and leaded glass aspect of the business. In 1913, The Salon reported that the leadlight department of RS Exton and Co was under the management of Herbert M. Smyrk who for many years was one of the principal artists in the studio of Messrs William Morris and Co, Ruskin House, London. He had previously produced much fine work in the studio of E. F. Troy in Gawler, South Australia. The windows produced by the RS Exton and Co are of very quality and are clearly influenced by the work of the English Arts and Crafts movement, particularly the stained glass work of Edward Burne-Jones. RS Exton and Co began to concentrate more fully on the design and manufacture of ecclesiastical and domestic glass.

To this end, RS Exton and Co employed several young artists to design the stained glass work. The most prolific and renowned of these designers was William Bustard who was employed in 1921 on commission as a stained glass designer. Bustard remained an employee on this basis with RS Exton and Co until the closure of the glass studio in 1958 with the demise of interest in decorative glass. Bustard was a prolific producer of fine stained glass which was used throughout Queensland, fine examples being in St Mark's Anglican Church, Warwick; St Paul's Presbyterian Church, Spring Hill; St Thomas' Anglican Church, Toowong; and St Paul's Anglican Cathedral, Rockhampton.

Other significant designers included Charles Lancaster, whose work survives at Hampton Court, Bowen Terrace, New Farm and George Oxlade who later formed his own painting and decorating business, Oxlade Brothers, who are operating to this day at art suppliers.

The company expanded in the 1910s or 1920s and another building was constructed adjacent to the western side of the 1907–1908 warehouse. This building has since been demolished. RS Exton died in 1921 and the company was compromised by the effects of the early 1930s Depression and by World War II. The business contracted through the 1940s and the glass department closed in 1958. In the early 1940s the Ann Street Warehouse of RS Exton and Co, was used by EJ Lynch Motor Body Repairs Hoods and Upholstery.

The remainder of the building apart from the facade was demolished in the late 1980s or early 1990s, prior to the heritage listing. The development that was to replace it was abandoned in 1990, and the site sat vacant until the mid-2000s, when the "333 Ann St" office tower was built in its place.

== Description ==
The former RS Exton and Co Building is situated on the south eastern side of Ann Street within a precinct of early low scale buildings, including the Masonic Hall, CPS House and St Andrew's Uniting Church. The facade continues the scale of these buildings. The remnants of the building include the north western facade addressing Ann Street and remnant walls returning from this.

The facade is a symmetrical composition of face brick construction laid in English bond with rendered detailing. The facade is surmounted by a parapet with a projecting stepped up central bay housing a pediment. A rendered cornice runs the length of the parapet and stepped section. The pediment detail is embellished with dentilling and with the date "A. 1907. D" in relief lettering. Flanking the pediment is lettering repeated on each side, "RS Exton and Co". The facade comprises a central round arched recess extending from ground floor level to just below the parapet. This central recess is flanked by narrower paired round arched recesses. The arched recesses of the facade are ornamented with rendered keystone and string courses.

== Heritage listing ==
The former RS Exton and Co Building was listed on the Queensland Heritage Register on 17 December 1999 having satisfied the following criteria.

The place is important in demonstrating the evolution or pattern of Queensland's history.

As the only known premises of the RS Exton and Co business, or its predecessors, to survive, the building facade at 333 Ann Street has important and rare associations with a prolific and well known painting, decorating and stained glass business who were responsible for work to many of Queensland's outstanding nineteenth and early twentieth-century buildings.

The place is important because of its aesthetic significance.

The RS Exton and Co Building comprises a well designed warehouse facade of aesthetic and architectural value which contributes to the scale and architectural quality of this area of Ann Street.

The place has a special association with the life or work of a particular person, group or organisation of importance in Queensland's history.

Through its position on Ann Street and the quality of the external detailing, the remnant building demonstrates the ethos and significance of the RS Exton and Co firm.
