= Glendalough (disambiguation) =

Glendalough is a former monastic settlement in County Wicklow, Ireland.

Glendalough may also refer to:

In Australia

- Glendalough (Melbourne), a heritage-listed house in Travancore, Melbourne, Victoria
- Glendalough, Rosewood, a heritage-listed villa in Rosewood, City of Ipswich, Queensland
- Glendalough, Western Australia, a suburb of Perth
  - Electoral district of Glendalough
  - Glendalough railway station

In Ireland

- The former Diocese of Glendalough
  - The current Diocese of Dublin and Glendalough

In the United States

- Glendalough State Park, Minnesota, US

== See also ==
- Bodleian Library, MS Rawlinson B 502, sometimes called The Book of Glendalough
