= St Brigid's Church, Rosewood =

St Brigids Church, Rosewood
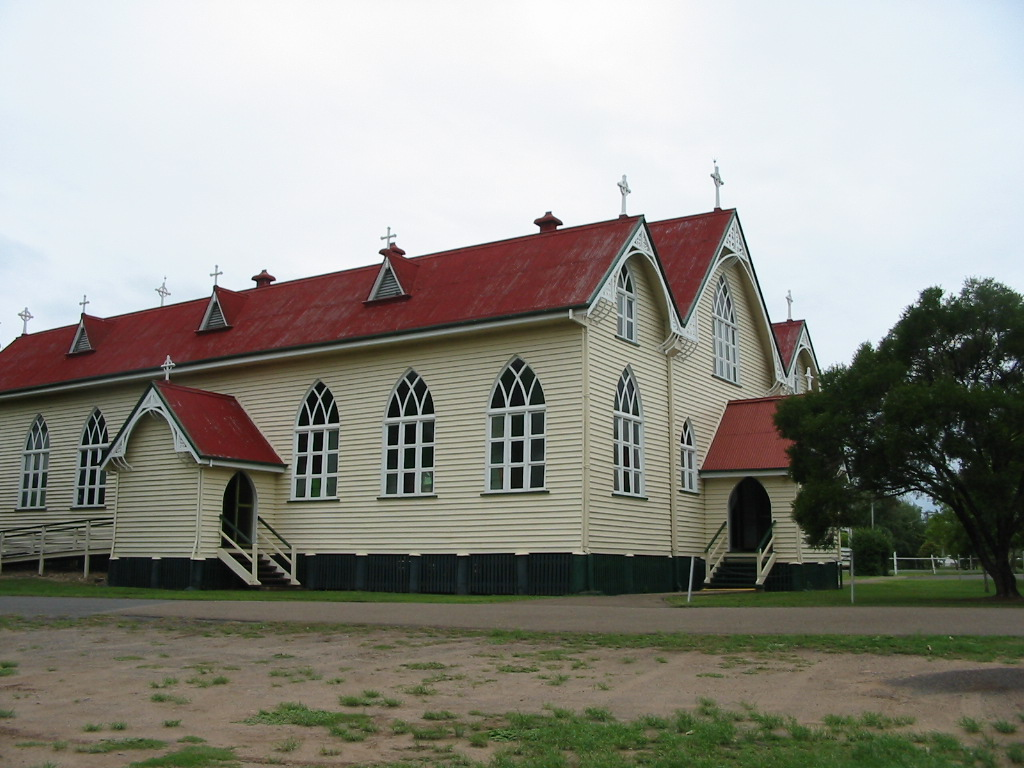
- St Brigids Catholic Church, 2006
- St Brigids Church, Rosewood
- 27°38′27″S 152°35′40″E
- Address: 11 Railway Street, Rosewood, City of Ipswich, Queensland
- Country: Australia
- Denomination: Roman Catholic
- Website: cp-wc41.syd02.ds.network/~ipswichc/our-churches/

History
- Status: Church
- Founded: 13 December 1908
- Dedication: Saint Brigid
- Dedicated: 13 February 1910 by Archbishop James Duhig

Architecture
- Functional status: Undergoing repairs
- Architect: Reverend Andrew Horan
- Years built: 1909–1935

Specifications
- Materials: Timber; corrugated iron

Administration
- Archdiocese: Brisbane
- Parish: Ipswich

Queensland Heritage Register
- Official name: St Brigids Church
- Type: State heritage (built, landscape)
- Designated: 21 October 1992
- Reference no.: 600736
- Significant period: 1900s, 1930s (historical); 1900s–1930s (fabric) ongoing (social)
- Significant components: Views to, tower – bell / belfry, stained glass window/s, garden/grounds, decorative finishes, mural / fresco, roof/ridge ventilator/s / fleche/s, church
- Builders: RJ Murphy

St Brigids Catholic Church is a heritage-listed Roman Catholic church at 11 Railway Street, Rosewood, City of Ipswich, Queensland, Australia. It was designed by Reverend Andrew Horan and built in 1909 by RJ Murphy with alterations in 1935. It was added to the Queensland Heritage Register on 21 October 1992.

== History ==
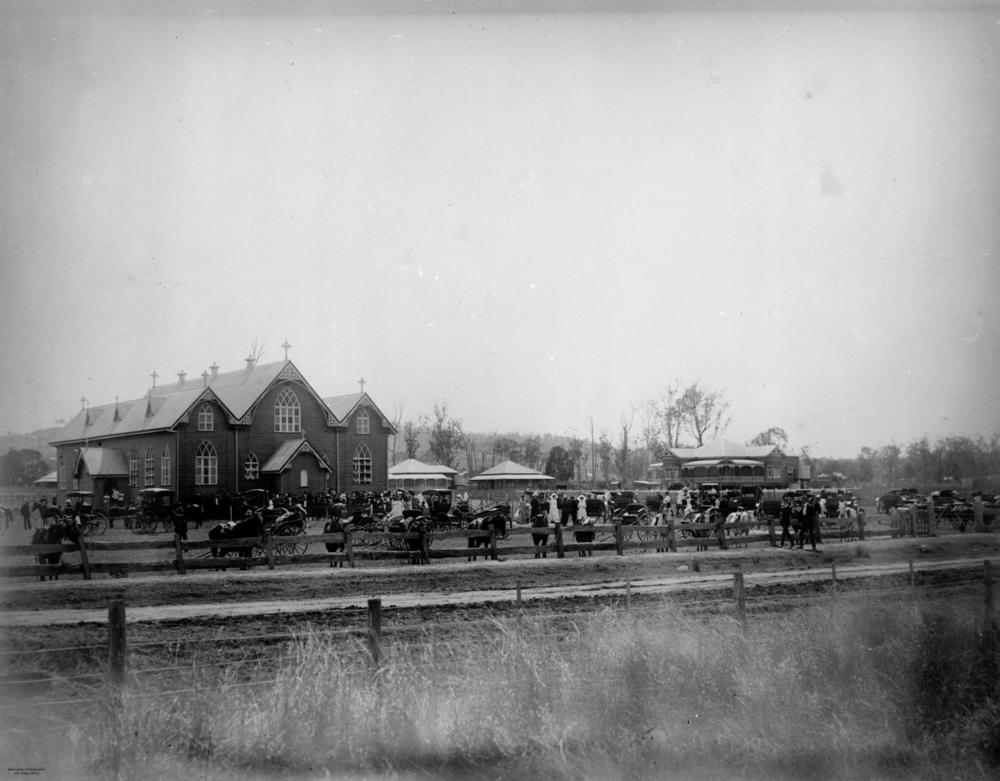
St Brigid's Church, Rosewood, 1910

This large elaborate wooden church was built in 1909–1910 and replaced an earlier, smaller St Brigid's Church, also of timber. It was designed by Reverend Andrew Horan of the Ipswich parish who also donated the cost of the foundations. It was built on the day-labour system under the supervision of builder and contractor, RJ Murphy. A substantial amount of the labour was gratuitously performed by local residents.

Initially, Mass in the Rosewood district was celebrated in settlers' homes, and after 1875 in a room at The Rising Sun Hotel. This practice continued until the first St Brigid's Church was built in 1885. The locality was a prosperous one, with sugar, timber and dairying supporting the predominantly Irish and German population. The foundations of the second church were blessed on 13 December 1908 and the building, which could accommodate a congregation of 1,000, was opened for religious services on 13 February 1910 by Archbishop of Brisbane James Duhig. Rosewood was the first country place in which, as a priest, Bishop Duhig had celebrated Mass.

St Brigid's Church remained part of the Ipswich parish until the appointment of Father Timothy Kelleher as Rosewood parish priest in 1915.

The interior of the northern wall was improved for the 1935 Jubilee Celebrations. Three stained glass windows by RS Exton & Co of Brisbane, and flanking murals on fibre supports by the important Queensland artist, William Bustard, were added. A scroll on the diagonal boards of the lower central section of this wall was probably painted about this time. After 1951 this part of the wall, including the top lancet-shaped sections of the vestry doors, was sheeted. It was painted with a new mural, using a photographic re-assisted technique. The scrolls on the lower sections of the side chapels were probably painted about this time. An early altar table used to celebrate Mass in settlers' homes has been brought into the church.

The altar rail gates, one of the confessionals and the organ have been removed. The rib-and-pan roof was replaced after 1973 and the earlier dark weatherboards are now painted a light colour. Plantings on the main southern elevation and the bitumen roads either side of the church are recent.

The place has been identified in the 1997 Expanded Ipswich Heritage Study as a place of cultural heritage significance to the community.

The church building had been slowly leaning for many years, and by 2020 it was deemed unsafe and required $3 million to make it level again. As at February 2022, the repair work had not commenced. Fundraising for a project to straighten and restore the church commenced in 2020.

== Description ==
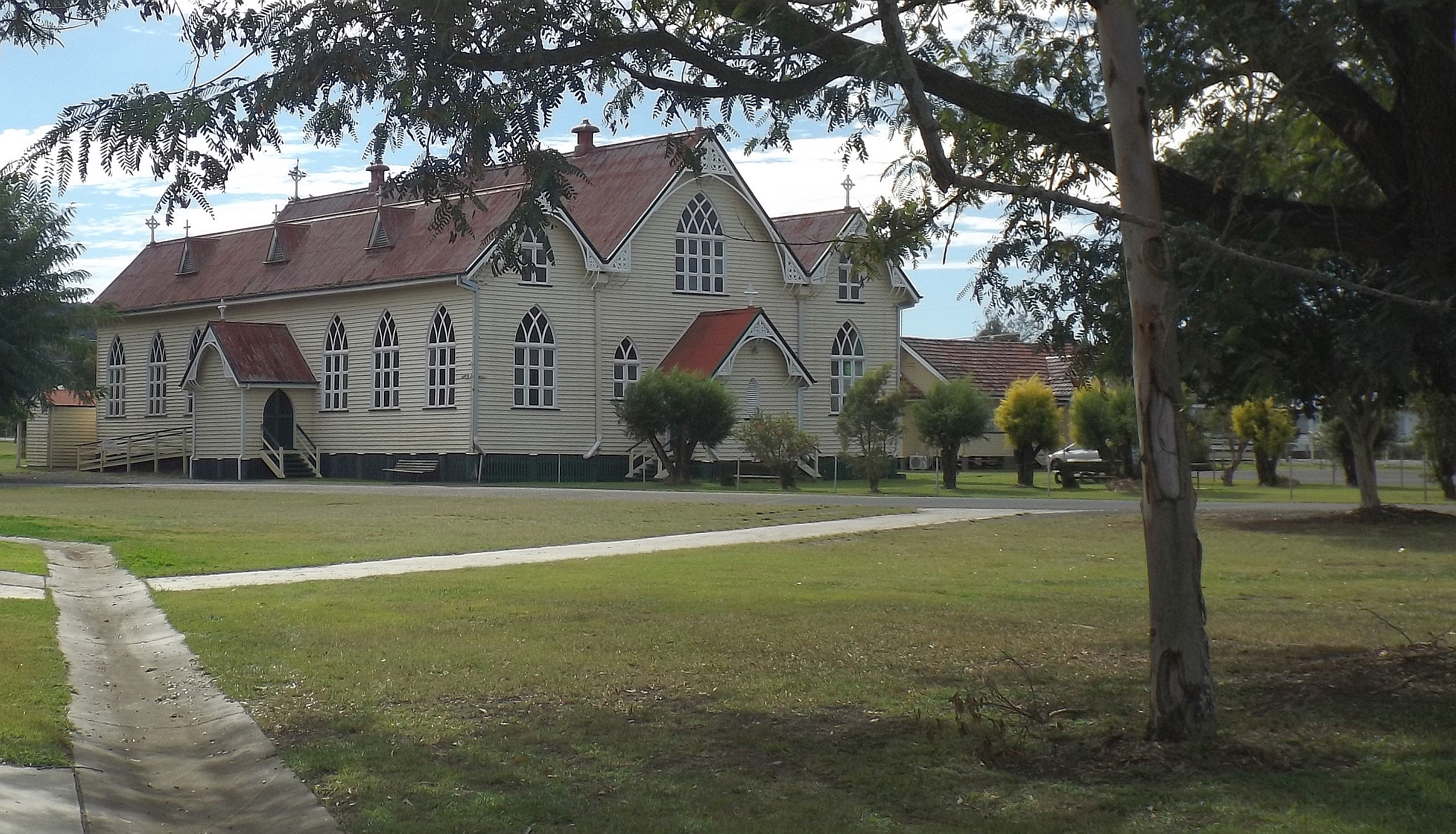
The building in 2015

This is a large ornate weatherboard church. It consists of three flush gables, the central one taller and wider, facing Railway Street. In plan it is a simple broad rectangle. Small gabled porches project at the front, and each side. At the rear, a skillion-roofed central section adjoins with gabled landings.

The church is set on timber stumps, about 1 metre (3 ft 3 in) high, with battening between.

Roofs are of corrugated iron, with front and porch gables surmounted by a cross and decorated with triangular timber fretwork panels on curved metal brackets. Three square, capped, ventilators line the ridge of the main gable. Three small steep louvred and gauzed gables ventilate the outside roof slopes. Windows are lancet shaped. Seven, of multiple openings, are aligned along each side; others symmetrically arranged at front, and at the rear. They are operated internally.

Rear stairs to the western side porch have been removed for the installation of a ramp. A detached timber-framed toilet block is under construction, close to the rear western corner. The rear landing is tilted on its stumps and closed to access.

A timber, cross-framed belfry with a shallow pyramidal corrugated iron roof, and bell in place, stands apart, to the rear of the church.

The church is set back some 50 metres (160 ft) from the street with a triangular grassed forecourt, hedged in part, with tall dense native shrubs. A flame tree (Brachychiton spp) and a fire-wheel tree (Stenocarpus) have been planted on the central axis of the church and forecourt.

Internally, a main high pointed vault is flanked by smaller similar vaults each side. A central aisle and smaller side aisles lead to a highly decorated chancel and side chapels. These spaces are divided by timber posts, chamfered. Between the posts, curved, chamfered timber members meet to form a line of pointed arches, above which extends a frieze of white-painted, moulded timber uprights.

Above the frieze are panels of pressed metal linking into the pressed metal vaulted ceilings, all highly decorative and painted in shades of blue.

The floor is of 4-inch (100 mm) boards of crow's ash, carpeted in the chancel, along the aisles and path linking side porches.

Walls are lined in 4-inch (100 mm) tongue-and-groove boarding, with lower and upper panels vertical, and a central section in diagonal boarding. The rear chancel wall is flat-sheeted, with large stained-glass windows, high under each vault. The central window depicts St Brigid, the left St Agnes and the other St Philomena. The central window is surrounded by an emblematic painting of foliage, grapes and wheat. Either side of the altar, this wall is painted with angels in shades of blue.

The altar and altar rail are pointed to resemble marble. Doors, either side lead into the flower rooms and sacristy. The central, closed, rear landing is used to store cleaning equipment.

At the opposite end of the church, above the entry, a gallery is supported on smaller intermediate posts. To the underside, a pressed metal ceiling, similarly elaborately painted, is of a different pattern from the vaulted ceilings. The gallery is approached by a timber stair, its balustrade crossing a window space. The gallery floor is raked, of 6-inch (150 mm) boarding.

A confessional, flat-sheeted, stands in one corner to the right of the ground floor entrance.

The church, a large and striking form, set in flat extensive grounds, exhibits a highly ornate and interesting interior.

== Heritage listing ==
St Brigids Church was listed on the Queensland Heritage Register on 21 October 1992 having satisfied the following criteria.

The place is important in demonstrating the evolution or pattern of Queensland's history.

St Brigid's Church, Rosewood, erected 1909–10, is significant historically for its close association with the development of the Rosewood district in the late 19th and early 20th centuries, and with the expansion of the Catholic Church in Queensland.

The place demonstrates rare, uncommon or endangered aspects of Queensland's cultural heritage.

The place is significant for the rare ecclesiastical mural by important Queensland artist, William Bustard.

The place is important in demonstrating the principal characteristics of a particular class of cultural places.

It is important in demonstrating the principal characteristics of a large, substantially intact timber country church built in the early 20th century.

The place is important because of its aesthetic significance.

The place has considerable aesthetic appeal, generated by the form, materials, decorative qualities (especially the gable decoration and pressed metal ceilings) and artworks, including stained glass windows and painted wall murals.

The place is significant for the rare ecclesiastical mural by important Queensland artist, William Bustard.

The place has a strong or special association with a particular community or cultural group for social, cultural or spiritual reasons.

The place is valued by the local community as part of Rosewood's heritage.
