= William Bustard =

English-born Australian artist

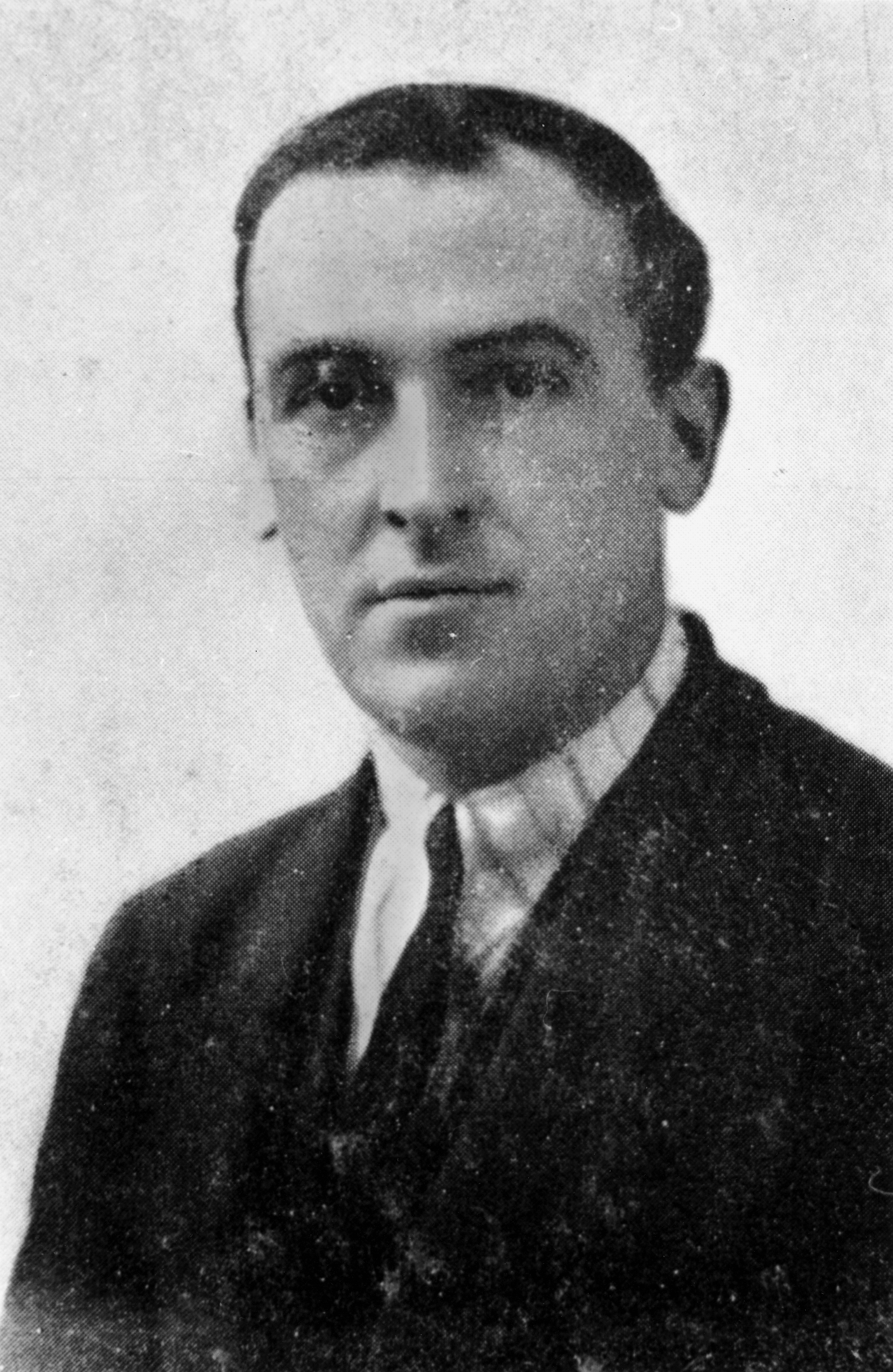
William Bustard, Vice President of the Queensland Art Society, ca. 1923

William Bustard (18 April 1894 – 24 August 1973) was an artist in Queensland, Australia. His stained glass work features in many heritage-listed buildings.

== Early life ==
William Bustard was born in 1894 in Terrington, Malton, Yorkshire, England. Living close to the York Minster, he was influenced by its stained glass work and music. He studied at the Scarborough Art School and won a scholarship to the Slade School of Fine Art in London.

During World War I, Bustard served in the Royal Army Medical Corps in Greece and Italy.

During his war service, he contracted tuberculosis. He immigrated in 1921 to Queensland, Australia where his health recovered.Not long after arriving, he joined the Royal Queensland Art Society, known then as the Queensland Art Society, and served on the management committee for many years with stints as President and Vice-President. He was made a life member of the Society in 1945.

During World War II, Bustard served in the Citizen Military Forces developing camouflage at RAAF bases. He was posted to Gayndah and Townsville where he disguised the appearance of Inland Aircraft Fuel Depots to look like farms.

== Artist career ==
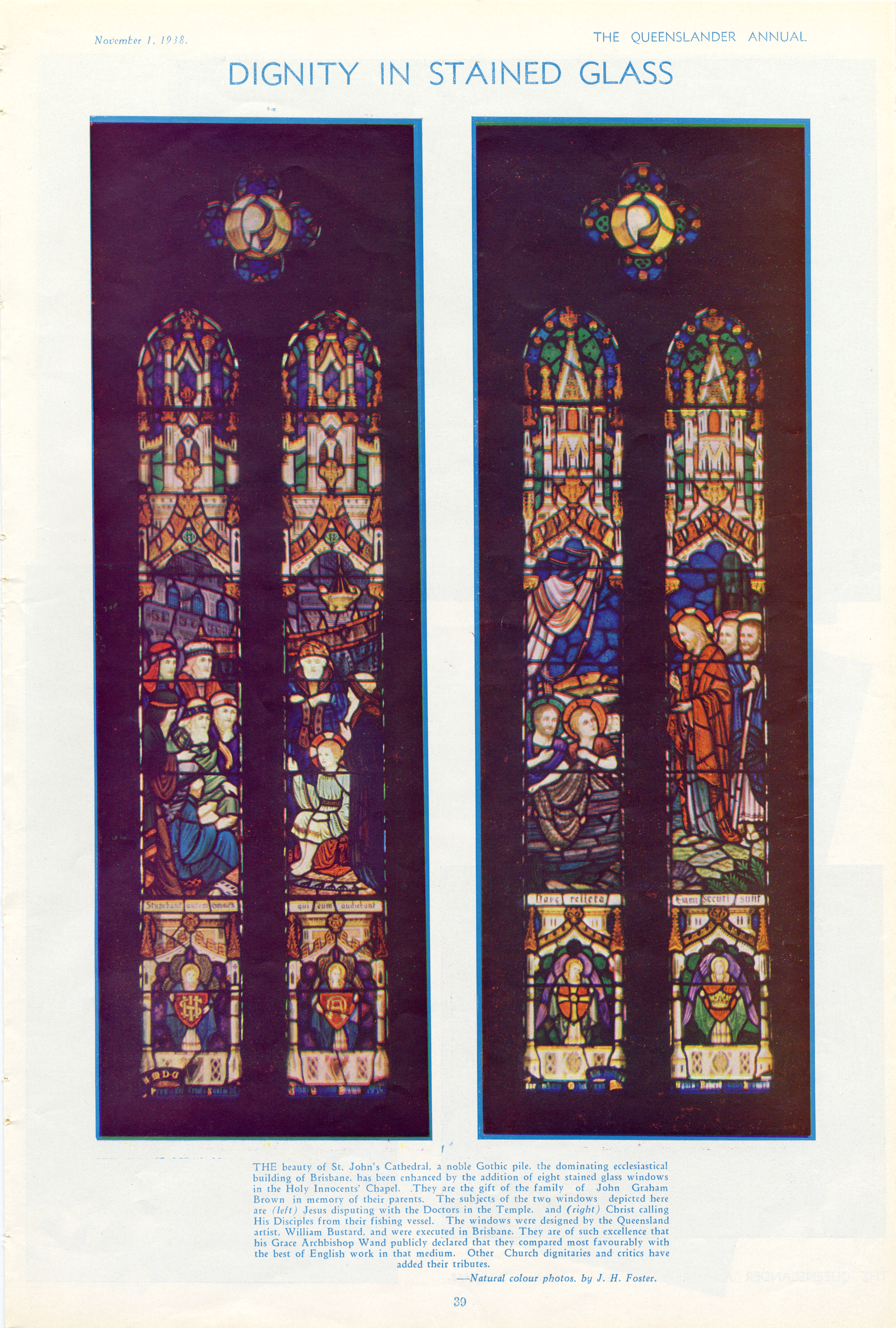
Jesus disputing in the Temple (left), Christ summoning his disciples (right), featuring Jesus disputing in the Temple (left), Christ summoning his disciples (right)

In order to make a living, he undertook a range of artistic work, including teaching and commissions. He illustrated books, including Robinson Crusoe (1949) and Treasure Island (1956).

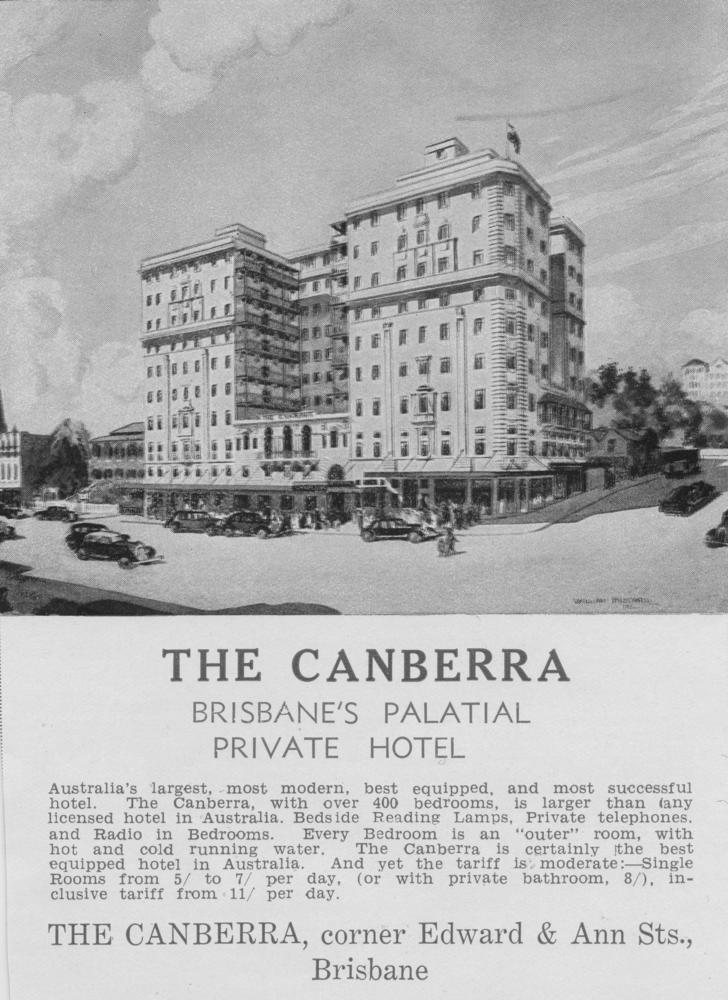
The Canberra, by William Bustard, 1935

He drew pictures for advertisements, including for:

- the Canberra Hotel in Brisbane

His stained glass work can be found in:

- Saint Mary's Catholic Church, Maryborough, Queensland
- Church of Saint Ignatius Loyola in Toowong, Brisbane
- St Thomas Church of England in Toowong, Brisbane
- Kurrowah, a mansion in Dutton Park, Brisbane
- St Pauls Presbyterian Church, Spring Hill, Brisbane
- RS Exton and Co Building in Brisbane
- St Brigids Catholic Church, in Rosewood
- St Barnabas Anglican Church, Red Hill
- St. Stephen's Uniting Church, Toowoomba

== Later life ==
William Bustard died on 24 August 1973 in Southport, Queensland.

== Exhibitions ==
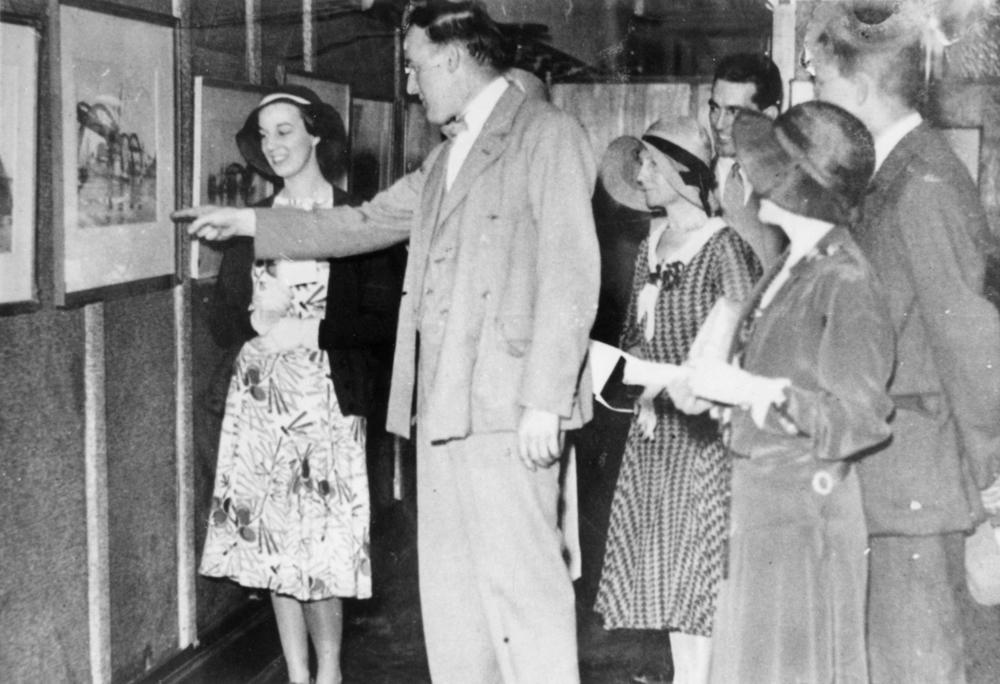
William Bustard at his first solo exhibition in Brisbane, October 1931

Major exhibitions of his work include:

- 1931
- 1945: Brisbane
- 1950: Finney's Art Gallery, Brisbane
- 1983: Brisbane Civic Art Gallery and Museum
- 2015–2016: Museum of Brisbane Painting with Light: an exhibition of the works of William Bustard from June 2015 to January 2016 (over 70 original works)
