= R. E. Pashen =

Australian Presbyterian minister

Ronald Edward Pashen (27 April 1914 – 18 Oct 1987) was a Presbyterian minister in Queensland.

== History ==
Pashen was born in Bulimba, Queensland a son of Edward John Pashen (c. 1884 – May 1948), a railway guard, and Eleanor Pashen, née Llewellyn, ( – c. 26 June 1953). Her father was Henry Llewellyn (1855–1933), MP for Gympie and brother Evan Llewelyn was MP for Toowoomba. On leaving school, Pashen was employed in the printing trade but became a home missionary for the Presbyterian church, serving in Crows Nest, Queensland, Townsville, and Thursday Island, where he married a fellow-missioner. He trained for the ministry at Emmanuel College, Brisbane and ordained in 1943. In 1948 he was appointed to St Paul's Presbyterian Church, Spring Hill in Brisbane, where he remained for the rest of his working life. He must have been interested in ecumenism, as he accepted nomination to the Council of Churches in Queensland, and served at least one year as its president, but when many Presbyterian churches joined the Uniting Church of Australia in June 1977, he elected not to join.

== Other interests ==
- Pashen was a noted youth worker, and deeply involved in the Police Youth Club.
- He was a member of the University of Queensland Senate
- He was a committee member of the Queensland Lawn Tennis Association.
- He enjoyed writing poetry, and contributed the words to at least one hymn.

== Recognition ==
Pashen was appointed MBE in 1963 in recognition of his long service to youth and the church.

== Family ==
Pashen married Alice Ross of Townsville on Thursday Island;

Pashen had two brothers: Harold B. Pashen and D. H. G. Pashen, and a sister who married Colin Teevan
