= Rosewood Courthouse =

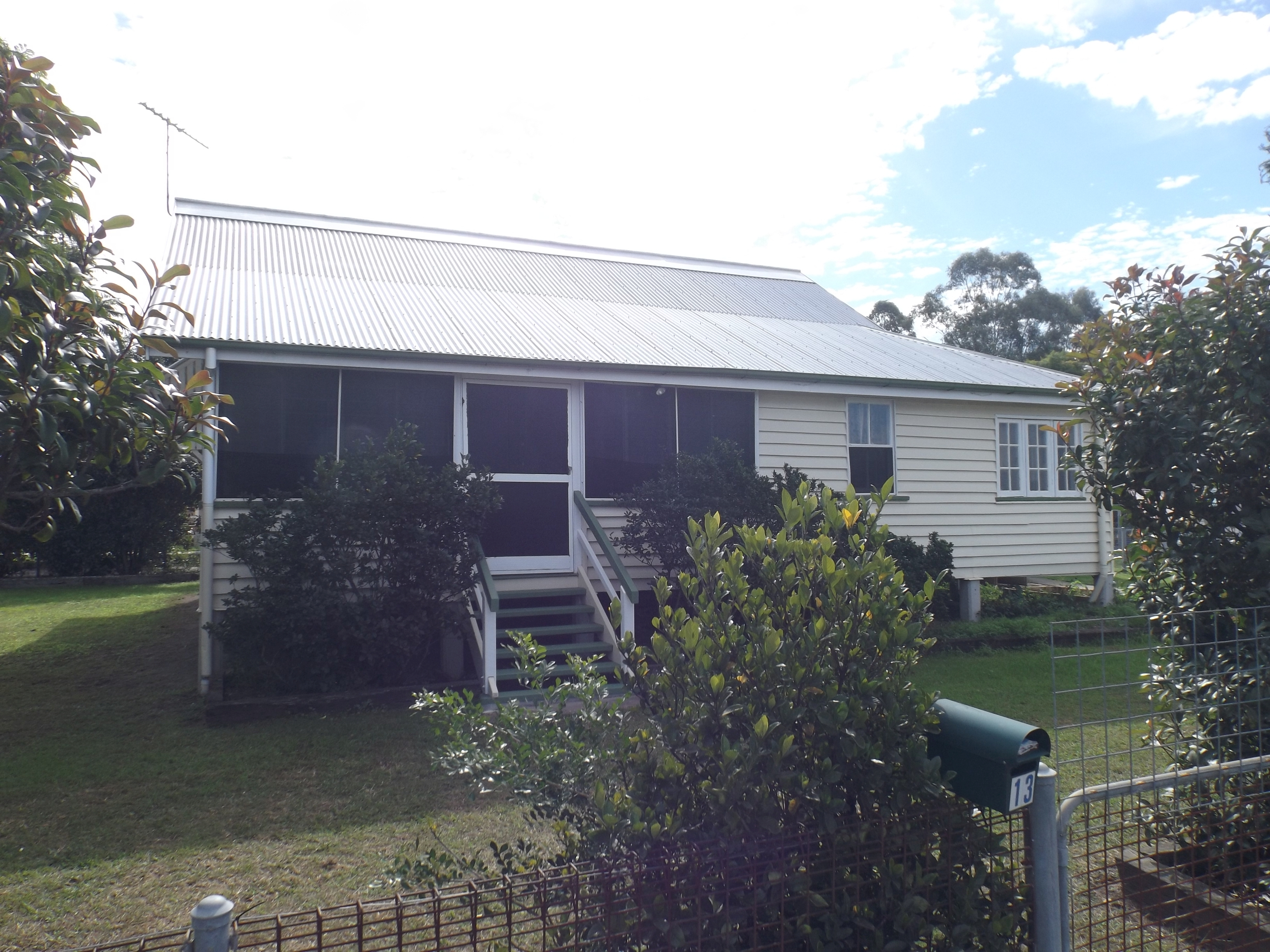
- 2015

- Location within Queensland Location within Australia
- 27.642°S 152.5938°E
- Location: 1 John Street, Rosewood, City of Ipswich, Queensland, Australia

History
- Design period: 1900–1914 (early 20th century)
- Built: 1908–1923

Queensland Heritage Register
- Official name: Rosewood Police Complex
- Type: state heritage (built)
- Designated: 6 June 1994
- Reference no.: 601101
- Significant period: 1900s–1910s (historical); 1908–ongoing (social); 1908–1910s (ct hse fabric); 1908–1920s (residence)
- Significant components: residential accommodation – police sergeant's house/quarters, court house
- Builders: C Risdale

Rosewood Courthouse is a heritage-listed courthouse at 1 John Street, Rosewood, City of Ipswich, Queensland, Australia. It was built from 1908 to 1923. It is also known as Rosewood police residence. It was added to the Queensland Heritage Register on 6 June 1994.

== History ==
The Rosewood Police Complex includes the former court house building and the police residence, both of which were completed in 1908.

Records indicate that a police station was established in Rosewood by the late 1870s. Until the early 1890s, Court at Rosewood was held in the single constable's room of the police barracks on the site of the present Police Residence at the corner of John Street and Walloon Road (renamed Railway Street). A detached Court Room was erected in 1892 on the adjacent site, fronting Walloon Road. By the turn of the century, court facilities were again inadequate and tenders for additions to the Court House were called in 1902. In 1905, a report described the condition of the police buildings as being in very bad repair, and concluded that "...Rosewood being a town of considerable importance, ...the wisest course would be to erect new Police Station Buildings."

The local community opinion appears to have been divided over the site of the new buildings, between another site, possibly the School Reserve which would enable the existing site to be sold for business premises; and retention of the existing site. Eventually, it was decided that the existing site was the most central and therefore the most suitable, and a new court house with offices for magistrate and constable, and a new police station (used as the police residence), double-cell buildings and stable were erected by C Risdale in 1908 for approximately £800. The old court house and police buildings were sold and removed from the site.

=== The Court House ===
Following erection of the new Court House, the police occupied the two offices at the rear of the building. This arrangement appears to have existed until 1916, when a Clerk of Petty Sessions (CPS) was appointed to Rosewood, after which the Police and the CPS occupied one office each. During the late 1940s, the court house was also used as additional sleeping accommodation for constables attached to the police station.

By the late 1960s, the facilities provided for the police in the court house were inadequate, limited to one office with no public counter and limited storage space. The northern verandah of the court house was enclosed in 1977 to provide additional office space for the police. By 1986, there was again insufficient space to accommodate the police, and a new police station was completed in 1987. During construction of the new building, the existing cell block and other outbuildings were removed, the cell block being relocated to the Rosewood BMX ground as a club canteen.

The Rosewood court house was closed in 1991.

=== The Police Residence ===
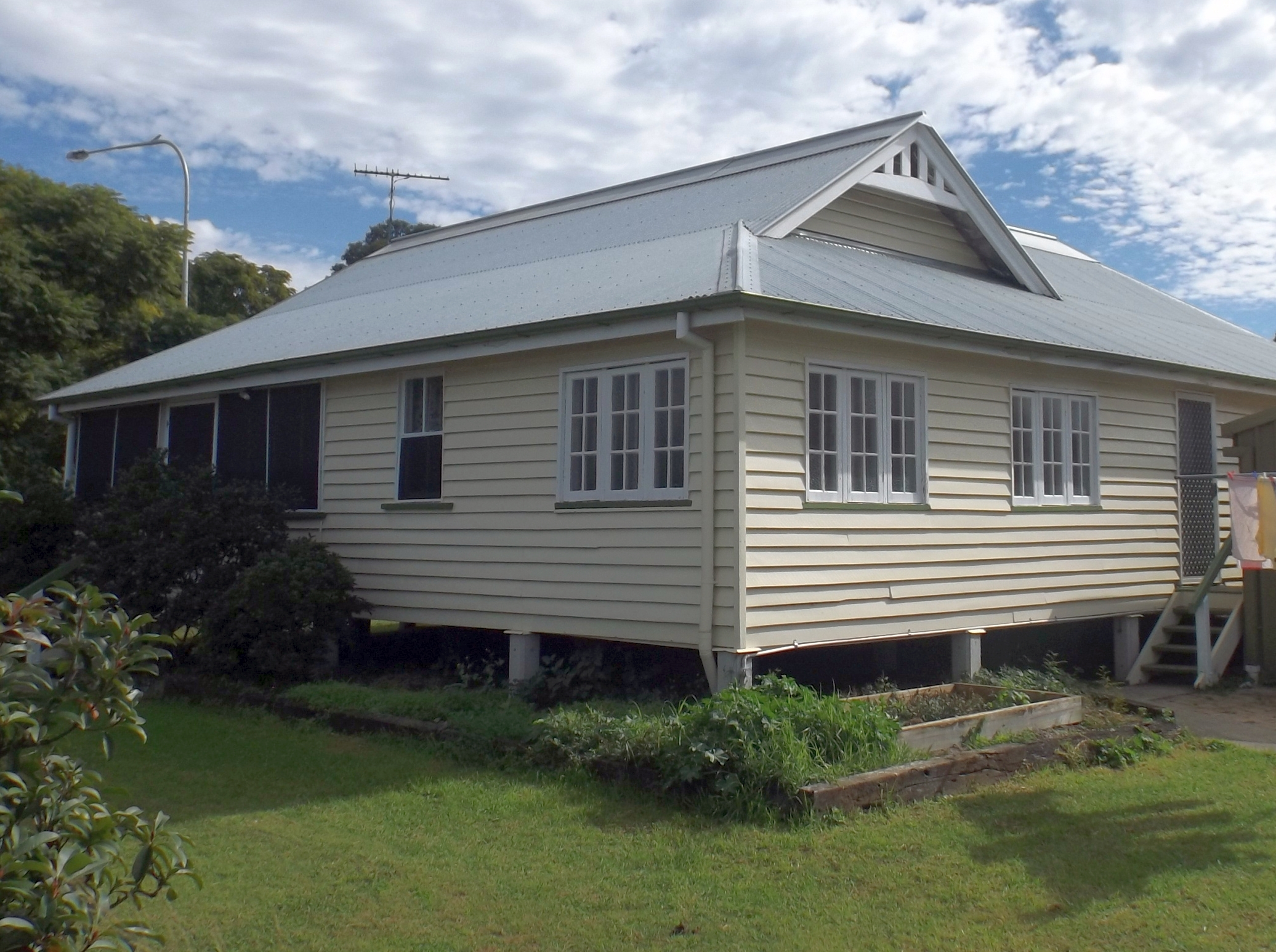
2015

A verandah was added to the eastern side of the Police Residence in 1923, and enclosed in 1939. An additional residence was completed in 1985 on adjoining land, with frontage to Railway Street.

== Description ==
The Rosewood Police Complex, located in the centre of Rosewood on the northern corner of Railway and John Streets, consists of a former court house and a police residence either side of a recently constructed police station. The complex forms a significant element within the streetscape of John Street, characterised by predominantly timber buildings.

The former court house is a single-storeyed timber building with a half-gable and hipped corrugated iron roof and concrete stumps. The building has a T-shaped plan with the court room, facing John Street to the southwest, surrounded on three sides by verandahs, and offices to the northeast.

The building has weatherboard cladding to the exposed northeast end, and single-skin exposed framing to the verandah walls. The northwest verandah has been enclosed with hardboard sheeting and louvred windows. Verandahs have a timber rail balustrade, timber posts and curved valance, with French doors and sash windows opening from the court room. The northeast end has sash windows with timber batten and corrugated iron hoods.

Internally, the building contains early court room furniture including a timber witness stand and Judge's bench. The building has boarded ceilings and vertical timber boarding to walls.

The police residence, located on the corner of Railway and John Streets, is a single-storeyed weatherboard building with a half-gable and hipped corrugated iron roof. The building has a verandah on the southern side enclosed with weatherboard and louvres, and a verandah on the northeast, which is a later addition, enclosed with weatherboard and casement windows. An enclosed verandah room is also located on the western side.

Internally, the building has vertically joined boarding to walls and boarded ceilings. Doors have fanlights and windows are mostly timber sashes.

The police station, a recent single-storeyed masonry structure, is located between the former court house and the police residence fronting John Street to the southwest.

== Heritage listing ==
Rosewood Police Complex was listed on the Queensland Heritage Register on 6 June 1994 having satisfied the following criteria.

The place is important in demonstrating the evolution or pattern of Queensland's history.

The Rosewood Police Complex survives as evidence of the development of Rosewood as a centre for the surrounding district during the early 20th century.

The place is important in demonstrating the principal characteristics of a particular class of cultural places.

The former court house is a good example of an architectural type developed by the Public Works department.

The place is important because of its aesthetic significance.

Through the use of materials, architectural forms and scale, the complex is a significant element within the Rosewood townscape.

The place has a strong or special association with a particular community or cultural group for social, cultural or spiritual reasons.

The site, associated with the police from the 1870s and buildings dating from 1908, maintains a strong association with the Rosewood community.
