= St Paul's Presbyterian Church, Spring Hill =

St Paul's Presbyterian Church
- St Paul's Presbyterian
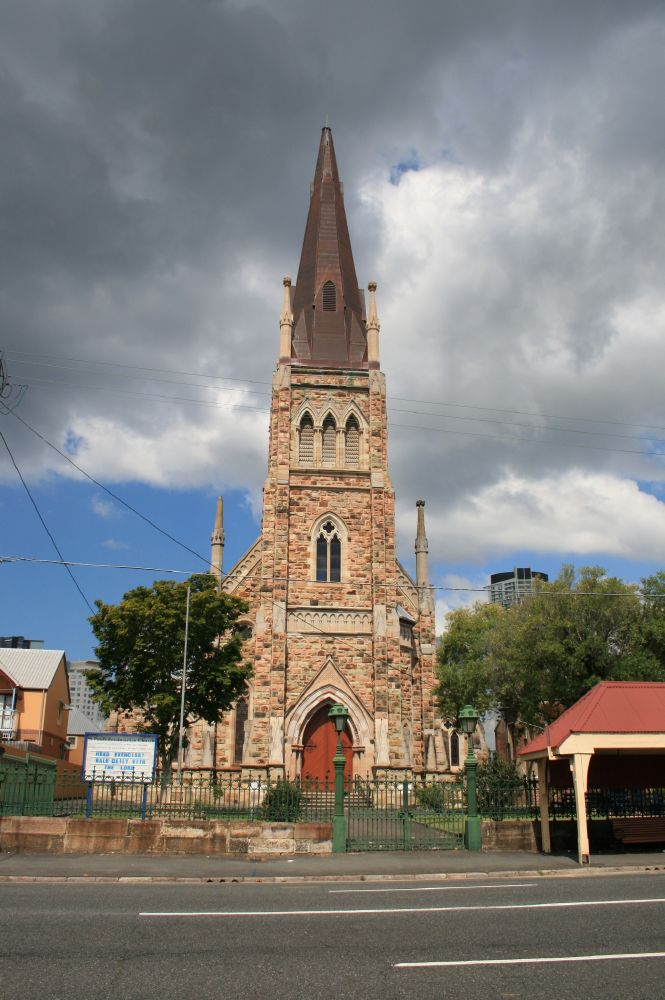
- St Paul's Presbyterian Church, 2008
- St Paul's Presbyterian Church
- 27°27′39″S 153°01′39″E
- Address: 43 St Pauls Terrace, Spring Hill, City of Brisbane, Queensland
- Country: Australia
- Denomination: Presbyterian
- Website: stpaulspc.org.au

History
- Status: Church
- Founded: 8 October 1887
- Dedication: Paul, the Apostle
- Dedicated: 5 May 1889

Architecture
- Functional status: Active
- Architect: Francis Drummond Greville Stanley
- Architectural type: Church
- Style: Gothic Revival
- Years built: 1887–1889
- Construction cost: A£11,000

Specifications
- Materials: Brisbane tuff stone; galvanised iron

Administration
- Division: Queensland
- Parish: Spring Hill

Queensland Heritage Register
- Official name: St Pauls Presbyterian Church
- Type: State heritage (built)
- Designated: 21 October 1992
- Reference no.: 600309
- Significant period: 1887–89 (fabric)
- Significant components: Tower – bell / belfry, stained glass window/s, pipe organ, furniture/fittings
- Builders: Thomas Rees

St Paul's Presbyterian Church is a heritage-listed Presbyterian church at 43 St Pauls Terrace, Spring Hill, City of Brisbane, Queensland, Australia. It was designed by Francis Drummond Greville Stanley and built from 1887 to 1889 by Thomas Rees. It was added to the Queensland Heritage Register on 21 October 1992.

== History ==
St Paul's Presbyterian Church, a Gothic Revival-style stone building which dominates the skyline at Spring Hill, was constructed between 1887 and 1889.

=== First church building ===
Following petitions and promises of land by the Presbyterian agitator John Dunmore Lang, over 500 Protestant Brits emigrated to the Brisbane area to establish a United Evangelical Church in 1849. This united church quickly collapsed after many of its Presbyterians left to form their own congregation. After the collapse, the Presbyterians who remained established a congregation (from which St Paul's would later come) aligned with the United Presbyterian Church of Scotland. They constructed their first church building on the corner of Creek and Adelaide Streets in 1863. This early timber structure was replaced in 1876 by a stone building of substantial proportions, which in turn was sold to the Queensland National Bank in 1886 and subsequently demolished. The sale enabled the purchase of a site in Leichhardt Street, Spring Hill for the construction of a new place of worship.

The Creek Street St Paul's Church was the location for the inaugural organ recital held in Brisbane, on 31 July 1883.

=== Second church building ===
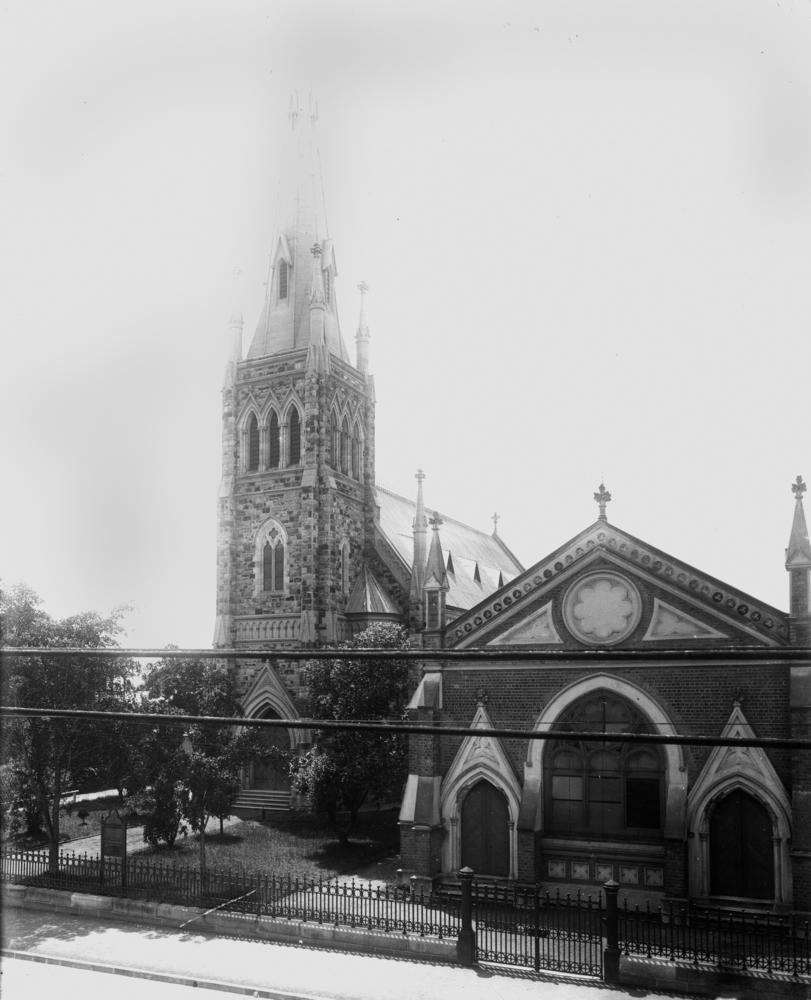
St Paul's Presbyterian Church (left) and Hall (right), c. 1912

Former Queensland Colonial Architect Francis Drummond Greville Stanley was commissioned to design a building well beyond immediate requirements, in anticipation of the church playing a more prominent role in the development of Queensland Presbyterianism.

Stanley had designed a number of masonry churches, including Holy Trinity Anglican Church in Fortitude Valley (1877), St Thomas' Anglican Church in Toowong (1877), and St Paul's Anglican Church in Maryborough (1879).

In 1886, a brick and stone Sabbath School Hall was erected on a corner of the site, and this building served as a temporary church for three years while the larger building was designed and constructed.

Contractor for the A£11,000 project was builder and alderman Thomas Rees (later mayor of Brisbane), who completed construction of the church in a little over 18 months. The foundation stone was laid on 8 October 1887. The church was officially dedicated on 5 May 1889.

Much of the stone from the demolished Creek Street church was re-used in the Leichhardt Street church. Also a stone wall with Glasgow-founded iron railings and entrance gates, a pipe organ manufactured by William Hill & Sons, London c. 1874, and prophet lights donated in 1878 by former Queensland Premier Sir Thomas McIlwraith, were removed to the new site.

Despite grand visions of St Paul's as the state centre of Presbyterian worship, the congregation was small and localised until the early 20th century, when a change of ministry encouraged a more active following. R. E. Pashen was a popular and long-serving (1948–1979) minister.

The interior of the church was redesigned in 1901. The organ and choir stalls were moved from a prominent position beneath the central arch to the southwest transept, and the pulpit was centrally elevated.

St Paul's became a community landmark in Spring Hill, recognised officially with the mid-1930s renaming of a section of Leichhardt Street from Boundary Road to Brookes Street as St Pauls Terrace.

A number of church facilities were extended in the post-war period. This involved installation of an electronic carillon ("the chimes") in 1950; commissioning of stained glass lights – designed by William Bustard in 1957 and executed by Oliver Cowley between 1958 and 1972 – for the aisle windows; the addition of an electro-pneumatic action to the organ in 1963; and the inclusion of a columbarium in 1967. Renovation of the cedar pulpit, rostrum and communion table was undertaken in 1976.

In the early 1980s the Friends of St Paul's was established, which conducted an appeal to raise funds for restoration work. Funds from the appeal and various grants permitted repairs to some of the ornamental stonework.

To help finance a complete restoration, the rights were sold to develop an office tower and townhouse complex on the site of the former manse, which was demolished. Eventually the land itself was sold.

== Description ==
St Paul's Presbyterian Church is a stone, Gothic Revival-styled building complete with buttresses, belltower and a spire rising 46 metres (150 ft) above the ground.

Cruciform in shape, the design incorporates a nave, aisles, and well defined transepts. The chancel is truncated. Essentially the plan is symmetrical, with the addition of a small southwestern entry porch for the spiral staircase to the belltower.

The steeply pitched gabled roof with ventilation gablets is clad in broad profile galvanised iron.

Three distinct types of stone have been employed in the construction: rough dressed Brisbane tuff, probably from the Spring Hill and Windsor quarries, for the walls and buttresses; durable Helidon sandstone for the window facings; and a softer and less robust sandstone, possibly from Breakfast Creek or Goodna, for other facings and decorative work.

At the front a pair of large cedar doors open to a main entry porch paved with tessellated black and white marble. One of the stained glass windows in the entrance, designed by Brisbane artist William Bustard and unveiled in 1923, depicts the apostle Nathaniel. This was donated by the Philp family, following the death in 1922 of former businessman and Queensland premier, Sir Robert Philp.

The interior is simple yet impressive: the nave, with its stone pillars and gothic arches, is spacious; exposed wooden arches support a roof lining of diagonal tongue and groove, v-jointed red cedar; and the walls are rendered. Each aisle has its own roof, above which a sequence of cusped windows in the clerestory permits natural lighting of the nave.

In the wall above the chancel are a rose window and four large stained glass windows of European manufacture, which depict old testament prophets. Double arched windows along the aisles illustrate ten events in the life of St Paul.

Red cedar has been employed for internal joinery and furniture, and the sloping floor is of pine.

St Paul's houses the only swung bell in Brisbane, which was cast in 1888 by John Warner & Sons, London. The bell chamber is noted for its perfect acoustic properties in transmitting sound to the nave.

After more than a century of use, St Paul's remains intact in form, structure, fabric and function.

== Heritage listing ==
St Paul's Presbyterian Church was listed on the Queensland Heritage Register on 21 October 1992 having satisfied the following criteria.

The place is important in demonstrating the evolution or pattern of Queensland's history.

St Paul's Presbyterian Church, constructed 1887–89, is significant historically for its association with the work of the Presbyterian Church in Queensland, and in particular, as evidence of the Creek Street congregation's anticipation of playing a prominent role in Queensland Presbyterianism.

The place is important in demonstrating the principal characteristics of a particular class of cultural places.

It is important in demonstrating the principal characteristics of 19th century Gothic church design in Queensland: it remains substantially intact, and is one of few churches in Queensland to fully realise the "gothic" style in stone. In addition, St Paul's is significant for its early pipe organ, stained glass and swung bell.

The place is important because of its aesthetic significance.

The place has considerable landmark quality and aesthetic appeal, and makes a strong aesthetic contribution to both the Spring Hill townscape and the skyline along St Pauls Terrace. It remains an integral element in a cohesive ecclesiastical precinct formed with the adjoining church hall and boundary fence.

The place has a strong or special association with a particular community or cultural group for social, cultural or spiritual reasons.

It also has historical significance as the origin of the name of a principal Brisbane street, St Pauls Terrace – indicative of a wider community association with the church as a Brisbane landmark.

The place has a special association with the life or work of a particular person, group or organisation of importance in Queensland's history.

St Paul's is important as a major example of the ecclesiastical work of former colonial architect FDG Stanley.
