= Glendalough, Rosewood =

Glendalough
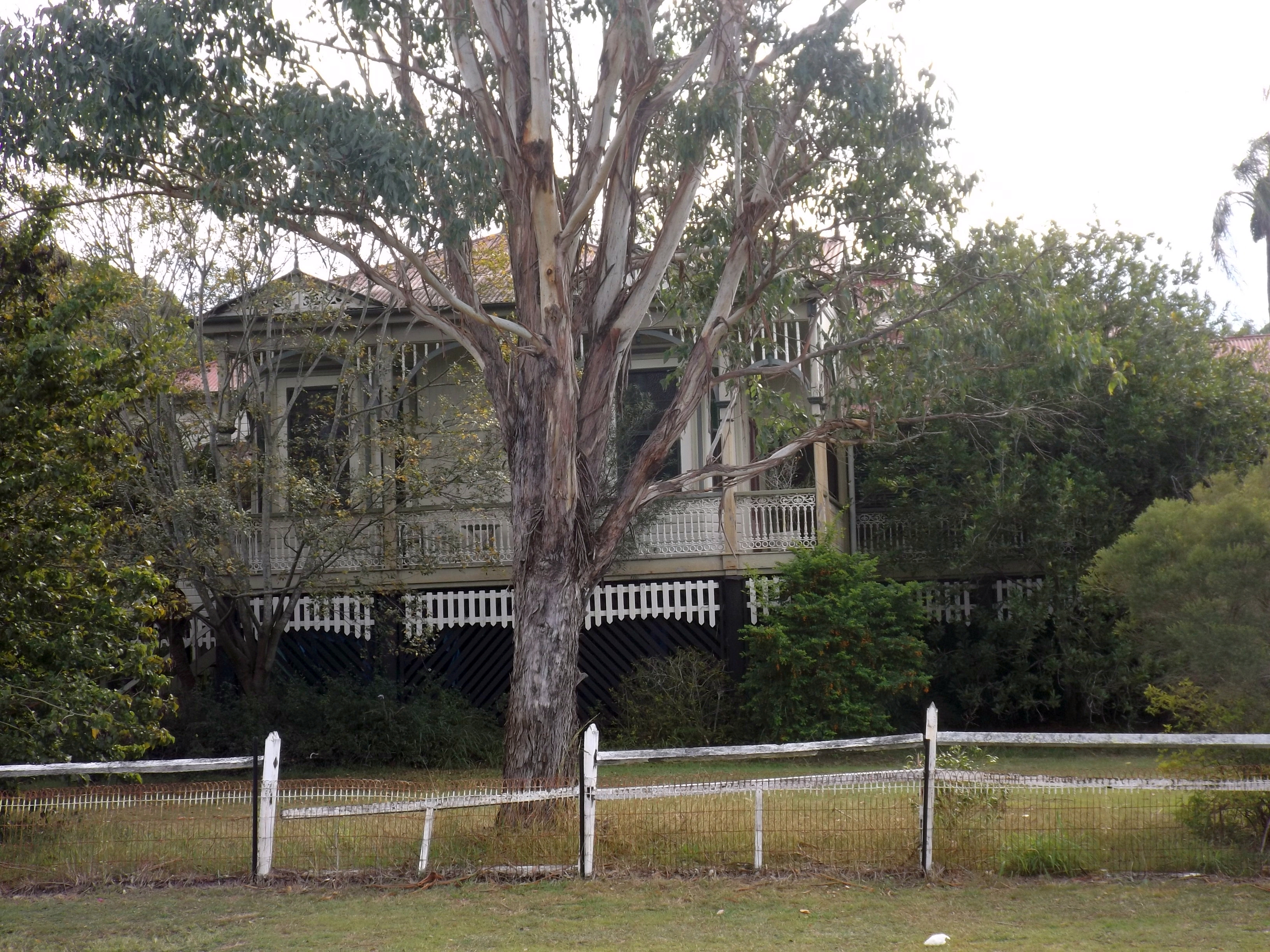
- 2015

- Location within Queensland Location within Australia
- 27.634°S 152.5892°E
- Location: 96 John Street, Rosewood, City of Ipswich, Queensland, Australia

History
- Design period: 1900–1914 (early 20th century)
- Built: c. 1900–c. 1911
- Built for: Thomas Ernest Bulcock and wife Edith Mary Bourke

Queensland Heritage Register
- Official name: Glendalough
- Type: state heritage (built, landscape)
- Designated: 21 October 1992
- Reference no.: 600735
- Significant period: 1900s–1910s (fabric); 1900s–1920s (social, historical)
- Significant components: kitchen/kitchen house, garden/grounds, pavilion, decorative features, residential accommodation – main house

Glendalough is a heritage-listed villa at 96 John Street, Rosewood, City of Ipswich, Queensland, Australia. It was built from c. 1900 to c. 1911. It was added to the Queensland Heritage Register on 21 October 1992.

== History ==
This large timber residence was constructed in two stages, with the flamboyant early 1910s extensions constructed for Rosewood storekeeper Thomas Ernest Bulcock and his wife Edith Mary Bourke, who were married in June 1910. The first stage constructed the living room, central hallway, dining room, verandahs, three bedrooms and the kitchen. The second stage added a bedroom, billiard room and another verandah

Rosewood had been established as a private town following the construction of the Ipswich to Grandchester railway in 1864–1865. Situated on the southern edge of the Rosewood Scrub, the town developed as a service centre to surrounding farms. In the late 19th and early 20th century the district boomed with the expansion of the dairying industry.

TE Bulcock was the son of seed and produce merchant and former Queensland parliamentarian, Robert Bulcock, Member of the Queensland Legislative Assembly for Enoggera 1885–88 and Member of the Queensland Legislative Council 1894–1900. He was born in Brisbane c. 1872 and worked with Brooks and Noble, hardware merchants, before moving to Alfred Shaw and Co. Thomas and his brother Arthur Bulcock launched their own business c. 1908, when they purchased a general store at Rosewood established by Frederick Lound, which they then conducted as Bulcock Brothers' The Trade Palace. The firm proved successful, and by c. 1919 was described as one of the most extensive general storekeeping businesses on the southern railway, between Ipswich and Toowoomba. By this date TE Bulcock also had an interest in a Rosewood auctioneering business, Whitworth and Bulcock.

In December 1910, Bulcock acquired title to a residential site of just over 1.25 acres (0.51 ha) in John Street, Rosewood. It is thought that a 6-roomed house was extant on the site at the time, and that Bulcock commissioned the flamboyant extensions which so distinguish the house from its neighbours, soon after purchase. He raised a mortgage of £800 on the land in March 1911, which may have helped pay for the additions. A c. 1919 (probably earlier) photograph of the house shows the extensions, which included a large billiard room on the south side of the house an octagonal summer sleeping room on the north side, and winged stair at the front. The accompanying description reads: Eight lofty and spacious rooms, in addition to kitchen and offices, are contained in the interior, while a feature of the house is a summer sleeping-room, formed by the bay, octagonal in shape, and 12 feet (3.7 m) across, with windows on all sides. The house stood in a flower garden adorned with statuary.

A late 20th century fabric analysis suggests that the house was constructed in at least two stages, the first comprising living room, dining room, central hallway, three bedrooms and kitchen, with verandahs to three sides (the 6-roomed original house). The large billiard room on the south side of the house and the verandah and sleeping room on the north side are clearly additions.

During the Bulcocks' residence, Glendalough was a focus for local social occasions. The family was well known in the community, and TE Bulcock was a member of a local masonic club. About 1923–24 the Bulcocks appear to have sold their Rosewood business, and left the district. In late 1923 Glendalough was transferred to the Grant family, who resided there until c. 1958. The house remains a family home.

== Description ==
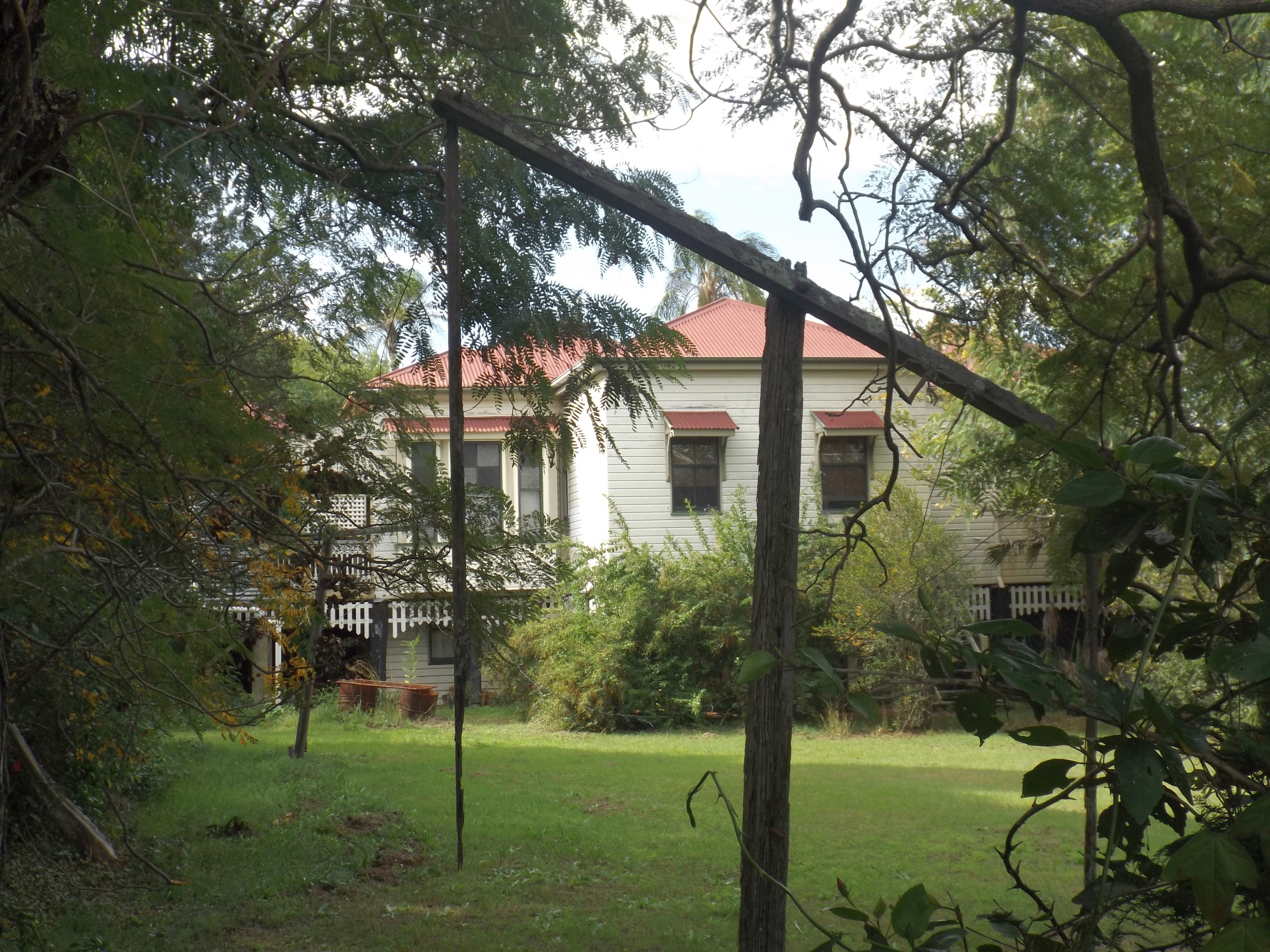
Rear view, 2015

Glendalough is a large, ornate, early 20th century timber home, high-set on a large corner allotment in the small town of Rosewood, near Ipswich. Despite a number of early accretions, the house presents a unified, elaborate form, with subtle suggestions of sectional rebuilding and extension. The roof contains a central pyramid with square ridge crested in cast iron. Gables decorate the eaves line to the eastern front and south. A verandah roof, set down around four sides, is interrupted by a projecting dominant front gable with hooded sash and side lights, and a rear hipped kitchen section with a rectangular window bay. A gabled portico projects over the front stair landing. The front stair, with balustrade of crossed timber members, descends in one flight, turning out into the garden from an intermediate landing.

Adjoining the main roof on the southeast is a smaller, short-ridged pyramid which roofs that section of verandah, extended an equivalent width to the south. This forms the living room. Decorative eaved gables face east and south.

All gables are sheeted and battened, with scalloped bargeboard. The high east gable of the southern wing, has a bargeboard of differing profile.

An octagonal bedroom, 5.27 metres (17.3 ft) wide, projects from the northeast corner. It has a segmental low-pitched sheet metal roof with central finial. Within each face is a large window with four-paned upper, and two-paned lower sash, and a smaller twin-paned window above.

Open verandahs with consistent cast iron balustrade follow the southeast facing corners of the house, and remain in place along the tree-screened north, between an enclosed bathroom section and the octagon. Bay windows, of chamferboard to sill height, project into the front verandah space to the east and south. Walls between are of vertical boarding. The front wall and window are set back behind a line of timber posts supporting the main roof. A slatted valance spans between these posts. The verandah ceiling is flat sheeted and battened. Verandah posts are timber, with moulded capitals, and fretwork brackets. Wooden blinds filter light to the wide front verandahs. On the outer face of the southern extension, a high arched and dowelled valance, with pendant, elaborates the bays. Bay windows reduce a narrow verandah space to about half a metre.

Interior rooms have pressed metal ceilings. Early light fittings, and cedar joinery remain in place. Walls are 4-inch (100 mm) vertical tongue and groove boarding. The opening from hall to lounge has been widened. Here and most notably in the hall, panels of lattice wrap around the central section of wall nibs. Fretwork of relatively recent date has been applied to the doorway between hall and dining room. The octagonal bedroom windows contain original pale green and yellow glass, and darker replacement panes.

From the octagon a walk-through sash opening leads to the northern verandah. Here a stair of later date leads down.

Under the house, all stumps are of timber. Diagonal battens surround the house, except where rear bays, sheeted in both weatherboards and chamferboards, enclose a storeroom and disused bathroom. There is, in places, attached, an additional outer skirt of short vertical battens. Along each side is a second line of diagonal battens one bay back.

A central stump supports the octagon, and here previously painted floorboards have been re-arranged, adding to evidence of the probable re-building of this room.

The house is set in a spacious garden accommodating formal and informal plantings.

== Heritage listing ==
Glendalough was listed on the Queensland Heritage Register on 21 October 1992 having satisfied the following criteria.

The place is important in demonstrating the evolution or pattern of Queensland's history.

Glendalough, erected circa early 1900s with substantial early 1910s additions, is important in illustrating the pattern of Queensland's history, being a fine example of the home of a successful local merchant in a small Queensland town during the boom years of the early 20th century. TE Bulcock's success reflected the growing affluence of the Rosewood district, which prospered in the early 20th century along with the dairy boom.

The place is important in demonstrating the principal characteristics of a particular class of cultural places.

Glendalough is important in demonstrating the principal characteristics of a substantial, early 20th century timber residence of a wealthy and influential local citizen, designed to impress, which employs decorative timberwork, design elements which accommodate the warm Queensland climate - including wide verandahs on all sides and a well-ventilated summer sleeping pavilion - and a substantial garden. The layout of the large formal entertaining areas provides evidence of the social standing of its original inhabitants, and of the building.

The place is important because of its aesthetic significance.

Glendalough makes a significant contribution to the Rosewood townscape, was closely associated with a prominent local businessman and the social life of the town, and is valued by the community as a local landmark.

The place has a strong or special association with a particular community or cultural group for social, cultural or spiritual reasons.

Glendalough makes a significant contribution to the Rosewood townscape, was closely associated with a prominent local businessman and the social life of the town, and is valued by the community as a local landmark.
