= St Thomas' Anglican Church, Toowong =

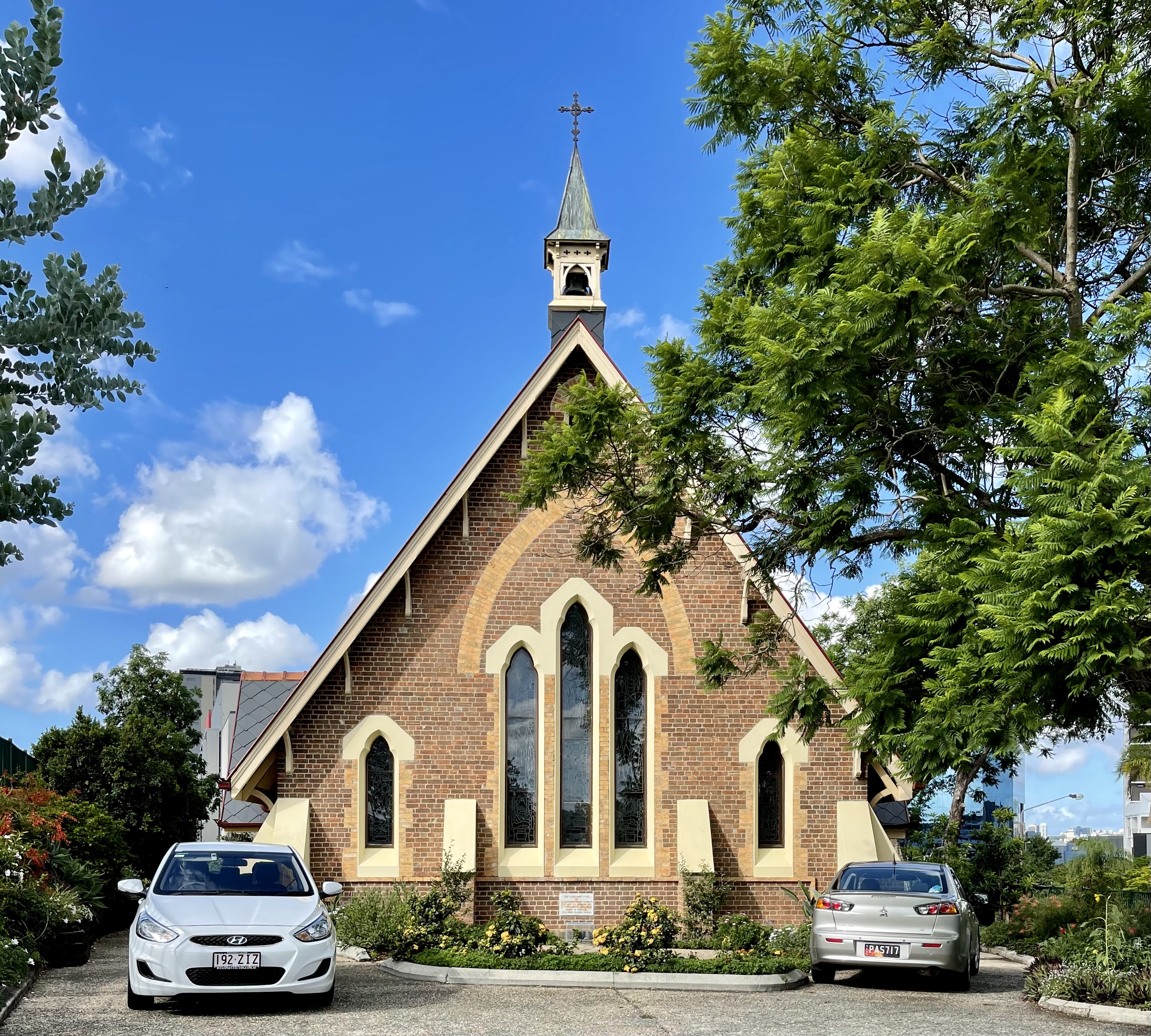
- St Thomas' Anglican Church, 2021

- Location within Queensland Location within Australia
- 27.4875°S 152.9904°E
- Location: 69 High Street, Toowong, City of Brisbane, Queensland, Australia

History
- Design period: 1870s–1890s (late 19th century)
- Built: 1877

Site notes
- Architect: Francis Drummond Greville Stanley
- Architectural style: Gothic

Queensland Heritage Register
- Official name: St Thomas Church of England
- Type: state heritage (built)
- Designated: 21 October 1992
- Reference no.: 600336
- Significant period: 1877, 1886, 1947 (fabric)
- Significant components: memorial – gate/s, stained glass window/s, wall/s – retaining, memorial – plaque, furniture/fittings, trees/plantings, steps/stairway, memorial – window
- Builders: Henry Pears

St Thomas' Anglican Church is a heritage-listed church at 69 High Street, Toowong, City of Brisbane, Queensland, Australia. It was designed by Francis Drummond Greville Stanley and built in 1877 by Henry Pears. It was also known as St Thomas' Church of England. It was added to the Queensland Heritage Register on 21 October 1992.

== History ==
St Thomas' Church of England was constructed in 1877 as the second purpose built Anglican church in Toowong, replacing an 1865 timber building on another site. The church, which was designed by parishioner and prominent Brisbane architect, FDG Stanley, has had two major additions, the first in 1886 when the nave was extended and the second in 1947 when transepts and a chancel were added.

Toowong was described in 1862 by a local resident, Richard Langler Drew, when he nailed a sign to a tree in the district proclaiming the village of Toowong, although the name of the district had been decided much earlier after the call of local birdlife. Soon after Drew's proclamation many large houses were erected in the area and Toowong prospered as a small elite settlement removed from the noise and dust associated with the town centre. It was not long before discussions were held about the establishment of a Church of England congregation which was to be an extension of the All Saints Church on Wickham Terrace.

When Queensland separated in 1859, Brisbane became the seat of an Anglican Diocese and the first Bishop, Edward Wyndham Tufnell was appointed. One year later, state aid to the Church of England officially ceased. Unlike England, where the Church of England was the established church which received state aid, the Church of England in Australia was to survive in the same manner as the other churches then operating in the country. This decision caused much uneasiness during the early history of the church as the hierarchy was unaccustomed to the processes involved with self funding, most significantly the fundraising aspect. Therefore, it is significant that following a meeting on 6 May 1865, Church of England residents of Toowong pledged to assist in the raising of about £150, necessary to construct a building for use as a Church of England. Among those at this first meeting was architect, William Henry Ellerker who was to design the first St Thomas' Church. Also at the meeting was Richard Drew who donated Allotment 13 where the church was to be built in Curlew street overlooking a cutting on Burns Road.

In June 1865, another meeting was held and this time it was chaired by Reverend Thomas Jones of All Saints' Church in Wickham Terrace; a manifestation of the diocese's support of the Toowong residents' scheme. The congregation at Toowong was to be part of the All Saints' Parish, and at this meeting details for the construction of the church were finalised and it was decided that the church could also be used as a temporary school as there was yet to be a state school established in the area.

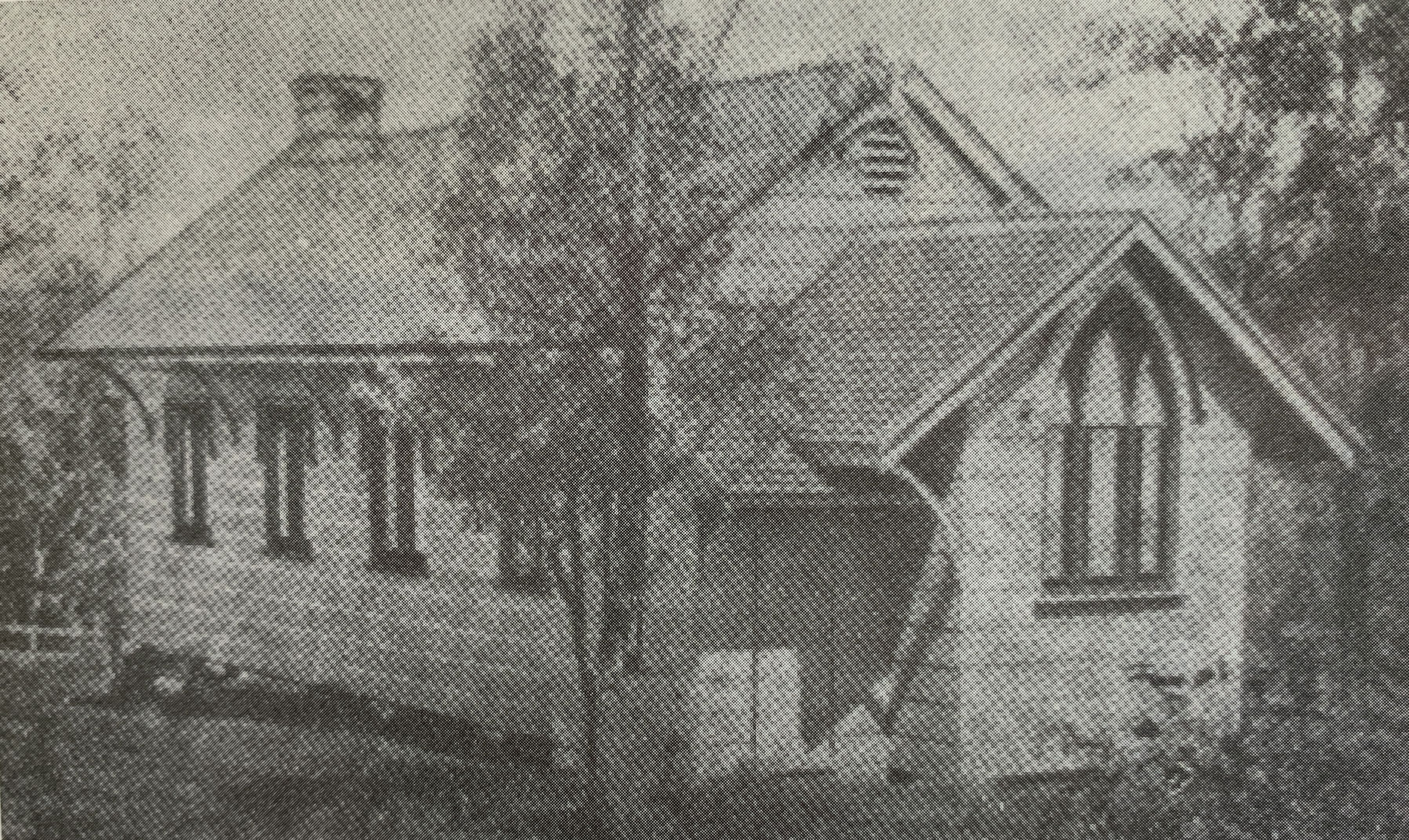
First St Thomas Anglican Church, 1865-1877

On Sunday 29 October 1865, the Anglican Church of St Thomas the Apostle opened on Lot 13 in Curlew Street, donated by Richard Langler Drew (27.48986°S 152.98869°E). It was a small timber framed and clad building with a gabled shingled roof featuring tripartite lancet window groups. The building cost £185.12.6 and was designed by Ellerker, the parishioner and architect, formerly of Melbourne who practised in Brisbane from 1864 until 1866. To defray the cost of the church a system of letting pews was instigated, securing a regular income but exposing the church to allegations of elitism. By 1867 a newspaper reported that the church, with a capacity of fifty people, was inadequate for the growing congregation. It was clear that steps toward procuring enlargements or the construction of a new church were necessary.

In 1870, St Thomas' became a parish, independent of All Saints'. The congregation then decided that both enlargements to the building and procuring the services of a minister were necessary. To fulfil the latter requirement Robert Creyke was appointed, but it would take some years before steps toward a larger building were taken. During the early 1870s many memorial items were donated to the church including a stone font commemorating Miss Georgina Hely, still in use today in the parish; an altar, an organ and a sedilia (or altar seat). When Robert Creyke resigned his post in 1875, Benjamin Glennie, a prominent and prolific Queensland Church of England minister was appointed.

In the mid-1870s, Toowong was rapidly growing particularly after the rail line was introduced in 1875 with a station at Toowong. While large houses were still constructed in the area, many newly planned streets started to fill with smaller family houses on tighter allotments. By 1878 a State School was opened in Aston Street. In November 1875, at a meeting of the St Thomas' Parish a decision was made to enlist the help of Church of England residents in the area for fundraising and donations toward acquiring a central site for a new permanent masonry church.

The construction of a bi-chrome brick church followed the laying of a foundation stone on 17 February 1877. The land on which the church was built, part of Allotment 27, was initially bought by Henry Buckley in December 1853 and then acquired in July 1865 by Robert Cribb, a successful Brisbane merchant. A Certificate of Title was granted to Benjamin Cribb for Allotment 27 in March 1872 and, after changing hands within the Cribb family once more, was acquired by trustees for the Church of England on 15 December 1876. The trustees nominated were William Leworthy Goode Drew, Walter Horatio Wilson and William Henry Miskin. The land remained vested in trustees for the parish until acquired by the Corporation of the Synod of the Diocese of Brisbane in 1968.

Again, the new church was designed by an active parishioner, Francis Drummond Greville Stanley who was the Queensland Colonial Architect at the time. Stanley was responsible for the design of many large churches throughout Queensland including Holy Trinity Anglican Church (Fortitude Valley), St Paul's Anglican Church (Maryborough), St Patrick's Roman Catholic Church (Carlton Hill, Gympie), St Paul's Presbyterian Church (Spring Hill), as well as smaller examples like St David's Church of England (Allora). The church Stanley designed for the St Thomas' parish, of which he was a longstanding and involved parishioner, followed many of the traditions of Early English Gothic parish churches, most significantly in its picturesque setting. The site was chosen for its centrality and prominence and the church was designed as a landmark on this prominent site. Many of the other features of the building contribute to its strong Gothic aesthetic including its dominant steeply pitched gabled roof, gabled porches, bi-chrome brickwork and lancet window openings, many of which were filled with stained and coloured glass in the twentieth century.

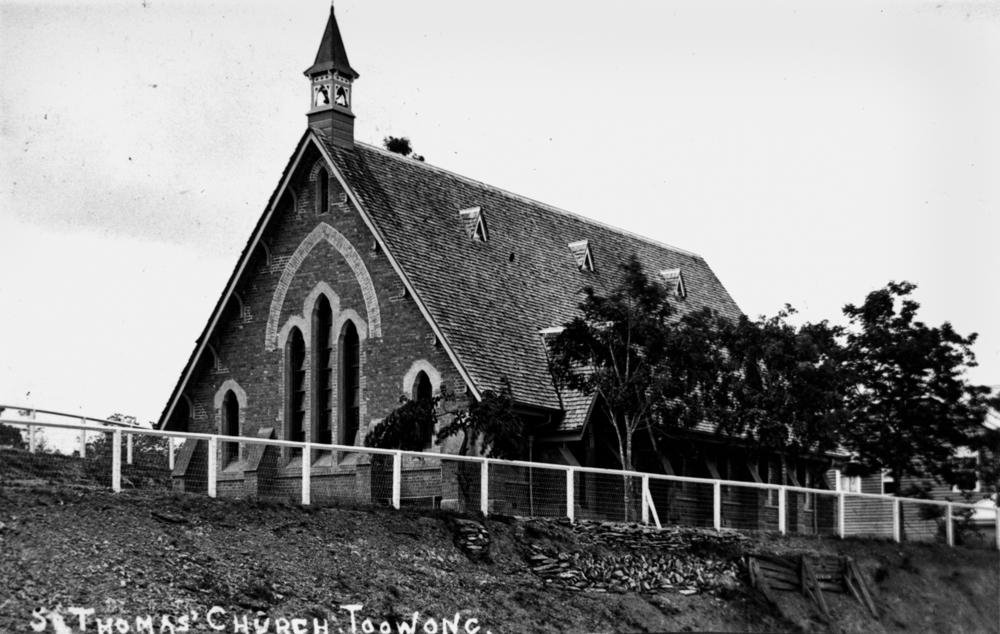
St Thomas' Church of England, circa 1900

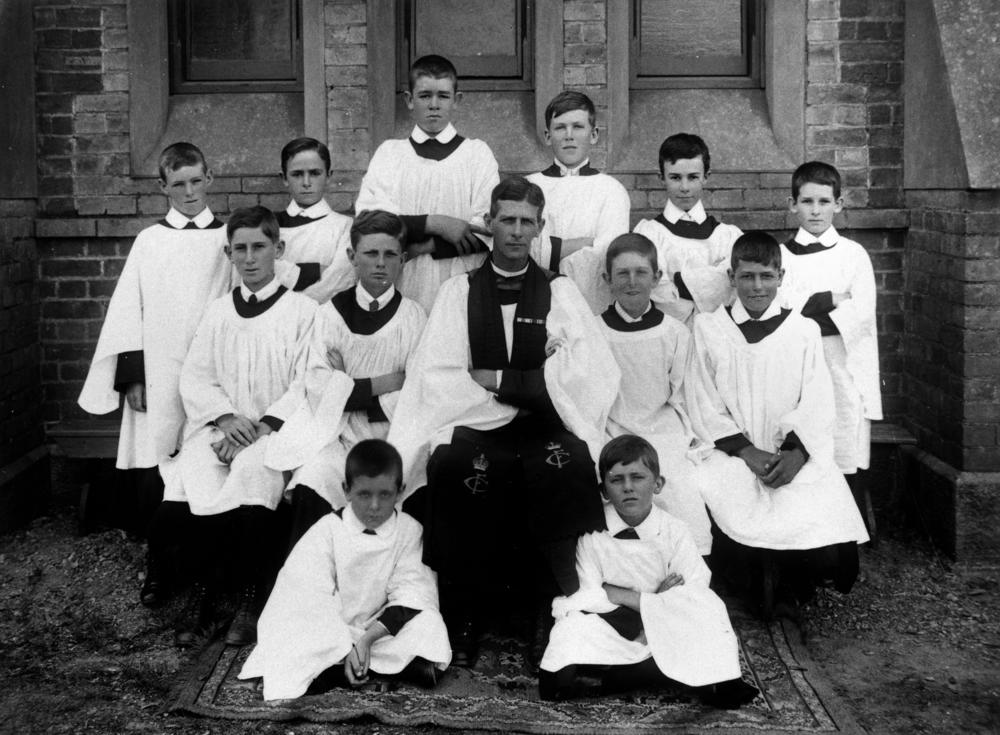
Choir boys at St Thomas', 1923

The foundation stone of St Thomas' Church was laid by Bishop Matthew Hale on 17 February 1877. The contractor for the project was Henry Pears and the building was constructed for about £850. An official opening ceremony in the form of a service was held on 14 October 1877.

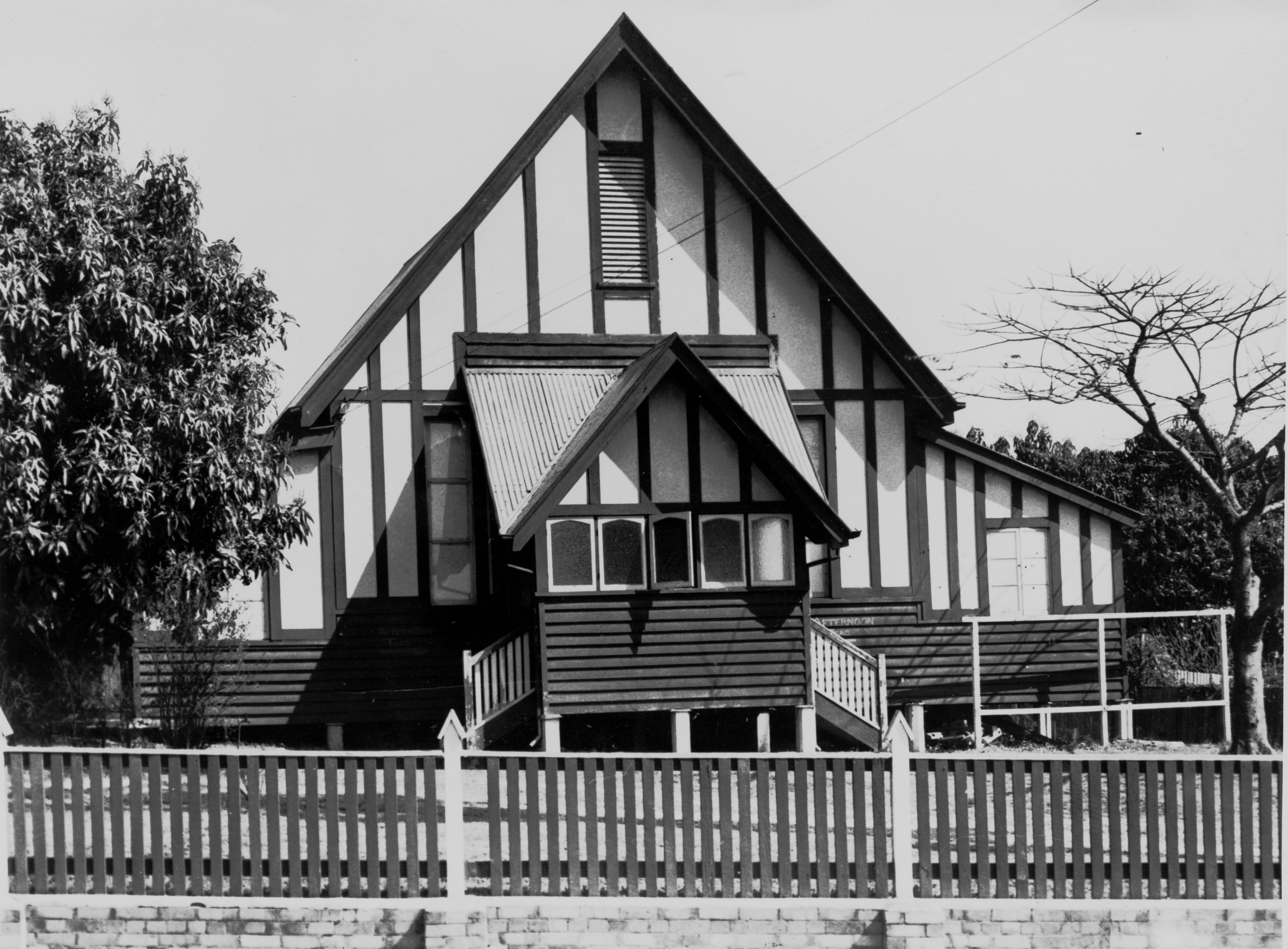
St Thomas' Anglican Church Hall, circa 1940

The first extension to the church was executed in 1886 when the original six bay nave was extended by one bay to form a seven bay nave. This work was designed by the original architect of the building, FDG Stanley and is apparent in the slight variation in colour of the brickwork of the seventh bay, at the northern, chancel end of the church. At this time the chancel was a temporary timber-framed structure, to be replaced in masonry when funding was available. In 1887 FDG Stanley designed a Sunday School for the Parish which is thought to have been constructed to the north of the building on land adjacent to the church. Later a rectory was constructed between the church and the Sunday School. A second storey was added to the rectory in about 1900. The celebration of the 75th anniversary of St Thomas' Parish was to incorporate an extension to the church building, incorporating a tower and a permanent masonry chancel at the northern end. Prominent Melbourne ecclesiastical architect, Louis Williams was commissioned to prepare a design for the building. It is not known whether he visited the site, but the perspective sketch he prepared for St Thomas' is a radical departure from the design of the original building. The additions proposed by Williams displayed a more Romanesque than Gothic influence, with a large parapeted tower partially concealing a pyramidal roof, and a chancel with parapeted stepped facades and grouped openings with, what seems to be, round arched heads. This construction of these additions was to cost £3400 and was to coincide with the construction of the large Roman Catholic Church of Saint Ignatius Loyola nearby. However, although many memorial gates, plaques and stained glass windows were added at this time, the proposed additions did not proceed.

By 1947, another scheme was commissioned, this time by Brisbane architect, Arnold Henry Conrad, from the partnership of Conrad and Gargett. His design was more in keeping with the original design of the church and, like the Williams' scheme, incorporated a tower and chancel at the northern end. Although the tower did not proceed, the new chancel was constructed at a cost of £3365 by Ashlar constructions. Like the original building this addition was constructed from brick, but on concrete foundations and with a concrete plinth.

In the early 1960s, a new low set brick rectory was constructed adjacent to the church, and this and the nineteenth century Sunday School and Parish Hall survived to the north of the church, although a fire in May 1970 gutted the school. By the 1980s, the upkeep on the rectory, Sunday school and hall (used for both church and community functions) was becoming too expensive, but equally the church could not afford to replace these buildings. In 1987, a commercial developer proposed to buy the land occupied by the rectory, Sunday school and hall and construct a large commercial building with the church having use of part of the building for its purposes with an off-site rectory (High Street having become too noisy and commercial). This was a controversial proposal within the congregation, but it was agreed to proceed, but the overall development was cancelled due to the downturn in the property market. However, the concept remained alive within the congregation and a similar commercial development arrangement was completed in 1998 with a parish centre established as part of a larger commercial building.

== Description ==
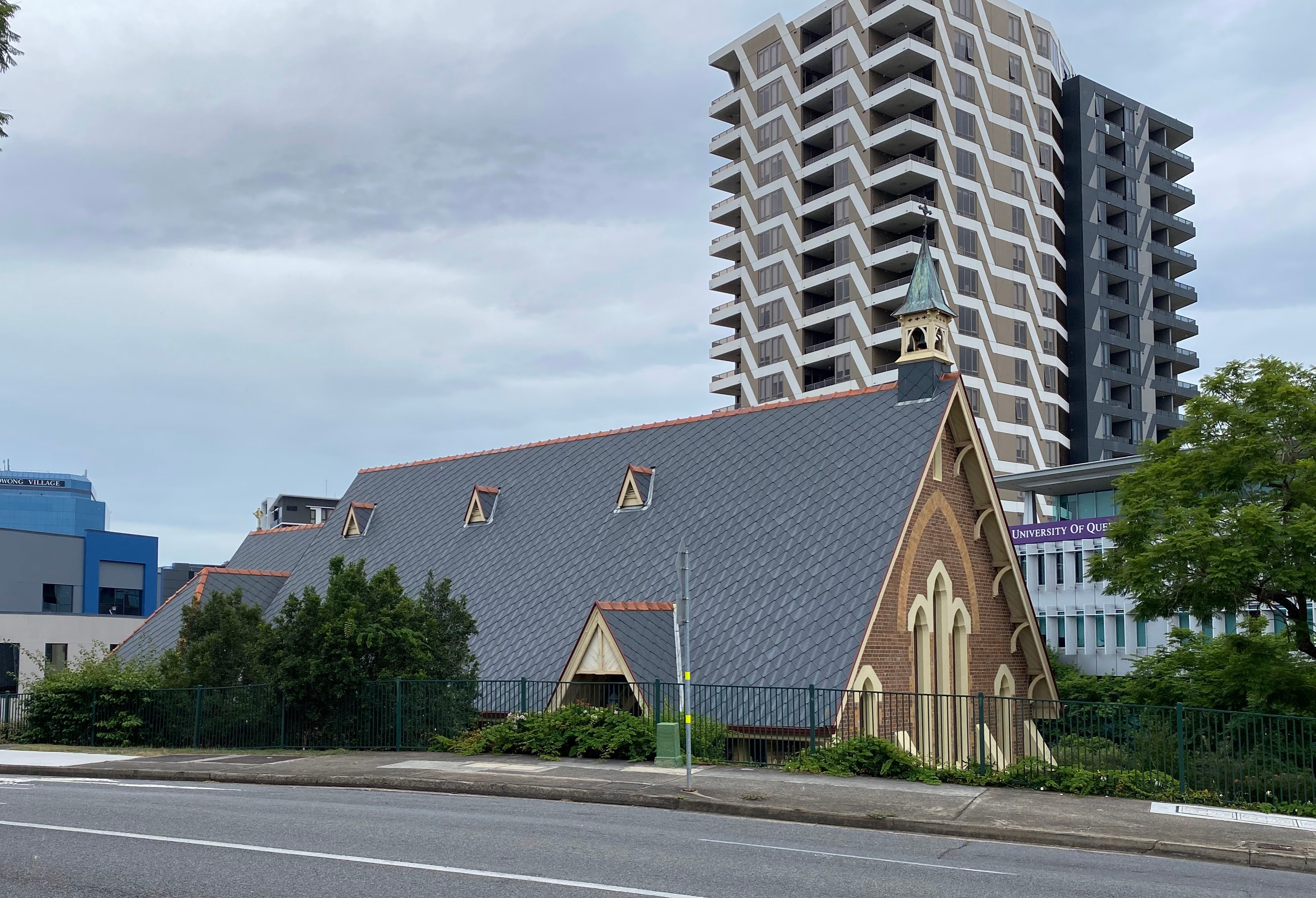
St Thomas' seen from Jephson Street, 2023

St Thomas' Church of England is situated on a prominent triangular site at the corner of High and Jephson Streets, Toowong. The site comprises a brick church surrounded by established plantings and trees and containing early retaining walls, fences, gates and stairs.

The southern, entrance end of the church addresses the corner of the two streets, where three substantial gate pillars with an iron palisade gate provide a principal entrance to the grounds of the church. Two sets of concrete stairs containing memorial gate posts and memorial plaques give access from the church grounds to the streets flanking the site.

The church is a bi-chrome brick building with a seven bay nave, chancel and a very steeply pitched gabled roof clad with diamond patterned fibrous cement shingles and terracotta ridge capping. A small decorative timber framed fleche at the southern, entrance, end of the church surmounts the apex of the gabled roof, and has a steeply pitched pyramidal roof with an iron cruciform finial. Generally the church is constructed from a dark brown brick and has cream brick detailing, in the form of window surrounds, arched window heads, quoining and string coursing. The church sits on a two course sandstone plinth, the lower course comprises rockfaced blocks and the blocks in the upper course are sparrow picked and margined. The plinth at the northern, most recently constructed, end of the church is constructed from smooth rendered concrete.

The southern, entrance facade has an almost triangular facade due to the overhanging eaves of the steeply pitched roof and squat side walls. This elevation is dominated by a centrally located tripartite window comprising three lancets filled with stained glass and with stuccoed sills and heads and all embraced by a cream brick pointed arch. Flanking the principal window are smaller lancets, with similarly detailed heads and sills.

The bays of the nave are defined on the eastern and western external facades with angle buttressing, which also lines the southern facade. The buttressing features a tapered head of rendered concrete, from which the timber eaves brackets spring. Diagonal buttressing braces the chancel of the church. Centrally located within each bay is an operable lancet window, filled alternately with figured and grisaille stained and coloured glass panels. At the southern end of both side elevations are steeply gabled porches, which are the principal entrances. These are flanked by buttressing which support the timber framing of the roof structure. The gabled ends are open, with a small triangular timber panel near the apex. The porches provide access to double pointed arched timber doors featuring ornate and overscaled iron strapwork hinges.

The northern end of the church comprises a chancel and two transepts. The chancel is a square planned, gable roofed structure abutting the body of the church to which it is similarly detailed although subordinate in height to the principal building. Flanking the chancel are smaller, square planned abutments with hipped roofs, which are in the form of transepts but are, in fact, small rooms, a vestry and a store.

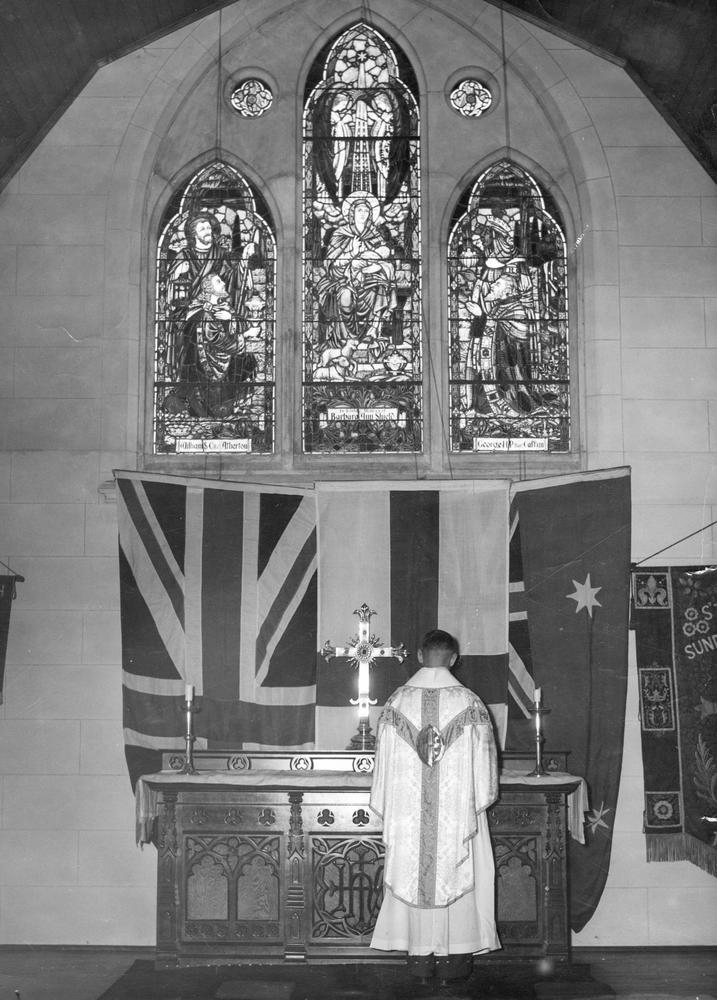
Reverend A. E. Loxton at the altar, 1952

Internally the church is arranged around a central rectangular nave dominated by dark stained timber boarded ceiling, on the underside of a steeply pitched roof. Supporting the roof and defining the nave bays internally are a number of dark stained timber, king post roof trusses. At the northern end of the nave is a chancel, separated from the body of the church by a pointed chancel arch. Internally the walls of the body of the church are rendered and scoured to resemble ashlar stone work. Though externally the church seems to have transepts, these projections, in fact, house a vestry to the west and a store room to the east with entrance to the rooms through timber doors flanking the chancel arch.

The chancel is boarded to about 2,100 millimetres (83 in) with timber panelling, featuring carvings of pointed arches with foiled heads. This panelling steps higher on the rear, northern, wall. On this wall and above the stepped panelling is a tripartite group of stained and coloured glass featuring images from the Adoration of the Magi and housed in a pointed arched recess.

A number of stone, marble or brass plaque memorials line the internal walls of the church and commemorate various figures in the history of the parish of St Thomas, including RL and A Drew and Sarah Frances Zitella Clark. Many of these memorials were carved by Toowong stonemason, William Busby and bear his signature. As well most of the stained and coloured glass, windows thought to be executed by William Bustard are memorials to parishioners. The tripartite stained glass window in the sanctuary depicts a scene of the Adoration of the Magi.

== Heritage listing ==
St Thomas' Anglican Church was listed on the Queensland Heritage Register on 21 October 1992 having satisfied the following criteria.

The place is important in demonstrating the evolution or pattern of Queensland's history.

St Thomas' Church is important in demonstrating both the pattern of growth of Toowong from an elite residential settlement in the 1860s to closer settlement following the introduction of the railway in the mid-1870s. As home to one of the earliest established Church of England parishes in Queensland, St Thomas' Church illustrates the development of the Church in the state.

The place is important in demonstrating the principal characteristics of a particular class of cultural places.

The building is a fine example of nineteenth century church architecture, showing a strong influence of an Early English Gothic style, which informed most ecclesiastical buildings of the second half of the nineteenth century. Elements of St Thomas' which show this Gothic influence include the steeply pitched and dominant roofscape; the picturesque setting of the building; bi-chrome brickwork; lancet and pointed arched openings; gabled porches; cruciform plan; heavy internal roof trusses and stained and coloured glass.

The place is important because of its aesthetic significance.

St Thomas' Church has remarkable aesthetic value with strong landmark qualities; it is a well composed building picturesquely situated on a prominent site. The building has many well crafted items of considerable aesthetic value including internal joinery, particularly the altar, pulpit, lectern and internal panelling; stained and coloured glass windows of William Bustard; font; various internal and external memorials and landscaping. The established plantings surrounding the church contribute to its picturesqueness and contain remnants of nineteenth and twentieth century garden design.

The place has a strong or special association with a particular community or cultural group for social, cultural or spiritual reasons.

The church has a special association with the St Thomas' parish as their principal place of worship for about 120 years.

The place has a special association with the life or work of a particular person, group or organisation of importance in Queensland's history.

The building has associations with prominent Brisbane architect, FDG Stanley and with other early parishioners, many of whom were important in the early history of the Church of England in Queensland.
