= The Deanery =

The Deanery is the name of several buildings, including:

- Deanery Garden, a heritage-listed house in Berkshire, England
- The Deanery, Brisbane, a heritage-listed house (also known as Adelaide House) in Queensland, Australia
- The Deanery, Perth, a heritage-listed building in Perth, Western Australia
