= Church House, Brisbane =

Heritage-listed building in Brisbane, Queensland

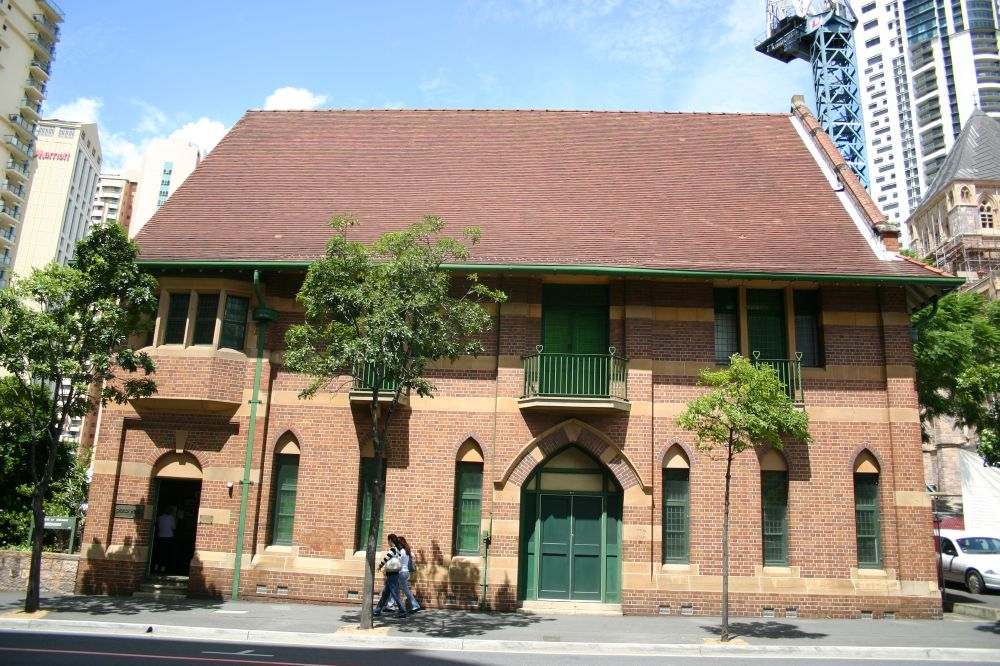
- Church House, 2009

- Location within Queensland Location within Australia
- 27.4635°S 153.0303°E
- Location: 417 Ann Street, Brisbane City, City of Brisbane, Queensland, Australia

History
- Design period: 1900–1914 (early 20th century)
- Built: 1909
- Built for: Anglican Diocese of Brisbane

Site notes
- Architect: Robin Dods
- Architectural styles: Gothic, Arts & Crafts

Queensland Heritage Register
- Official name: Church House
- Type: state heritage (built)
- Designated: 21 October 1992
- Reference no.: 600077
- Significant period: 1909 (fabric)

Church House is a heritage-listed office building at 417 Ann Street, Brisbane City, City of Brisbane, Queensland, Australia. It sits within the grounds of St John's Cathedral, Brisbane. It was designed by Robin Dods and built in 1909. It was added to the Queensland Heritage Register on 21 October 1992.

== History ==
In 1899 the Church of England acquired property in Ann Street for the construction of a St John's Cathedral, a day school and church offices. In 1909 Church House, to a design of Robin Dods, the diocesan architect, was built as the Diocesan Offices for the Anglican Diocese of Brisbane. It was stage one of a complex which was also to include a Synod Hall. The complete design followed an L-shape plan and would have extended the building close to Webber House, creating a small closed space around St John's Cathedral. The design was applauded by fellow architects and displayed at the Royal Academy Exhibition at London in 1910.

Church House is still used as offices and currently houses the Diocesan Archives and the Anglican Schools Commission. In the past, it has also housed the Australian Board of Missions, Anglican Refugee and Mission Service, Mothers Union, and the Social Welfare department of the Diocese.

== Description ==
Church House is a two-storeyed building, constructed in brick with some relieving stone courses and dressings to the windows. The steeply pitched gable roof is tiled and finishes at the southern end with a low raking parapet. The other end features a simple gable indicating the proposed second stage extension.

It is essentially Gothic in its overall form, especially the dominant high pitched roof and narrow lancet windows but has been greatly influenced by the Arts and Crafts movement. The upper storey of the Ann Street facade has three cantilevered concrete balconies with wrought iron balustrading and an oriel window. The eaves overhang of the roof skirts around the gable ends as a sunhood. The fenestration on the upper level has square heads while the lower level has gothic arches apart from a side doorway which has a semi-circular arch. The main entry off Ann Street is a broad gothic arched opening with stone trimmings.

Internally, most of the original fabric remains. Changes have included some modern partitioning and surface ducted air-conditioning.

== Heritage listing ==
Church House was listed on the Queensland Heritage Register on 21 October 1992 having satisfied the following criteria.

The place is important in demonstrating the evolution or pattern of Queensland's history.

Church House is significant for its association with the Anglican Diocese since 1904.

The place is important in demonstrating the principal characteristics of a particular class of cultural places.

Combining the Arts and Crafts manner, Church House is significant for its well resolved design and detail, forming an integral part of an ecclesiastical group of buildings.

The place is important because of its aesthetic significance.

Combining the Arts and Crafts manner, Church House is significant for its well resolved design and detail, forming an integral part of an ecclesiastical group of buildings.

The place is important in demonstrating a high degree of creative or technical achievement at a particular period.

Combining the Arts and Crafts manner, Church House is significant for its well resolved design and detail, forming an integral part of an ecclesiastical group of buildings.

The place has a special association with the life or work of a particular person, group or organisation of importance in Queensland's history.

Church House is significant as an important work of prominent Brisbane architect Robin Dods.

== See also ==
- The Deanery, Brisbane
