= St John's Cathedral (Brisbane) =

- Cathedral Church of Saint John the Evangelist
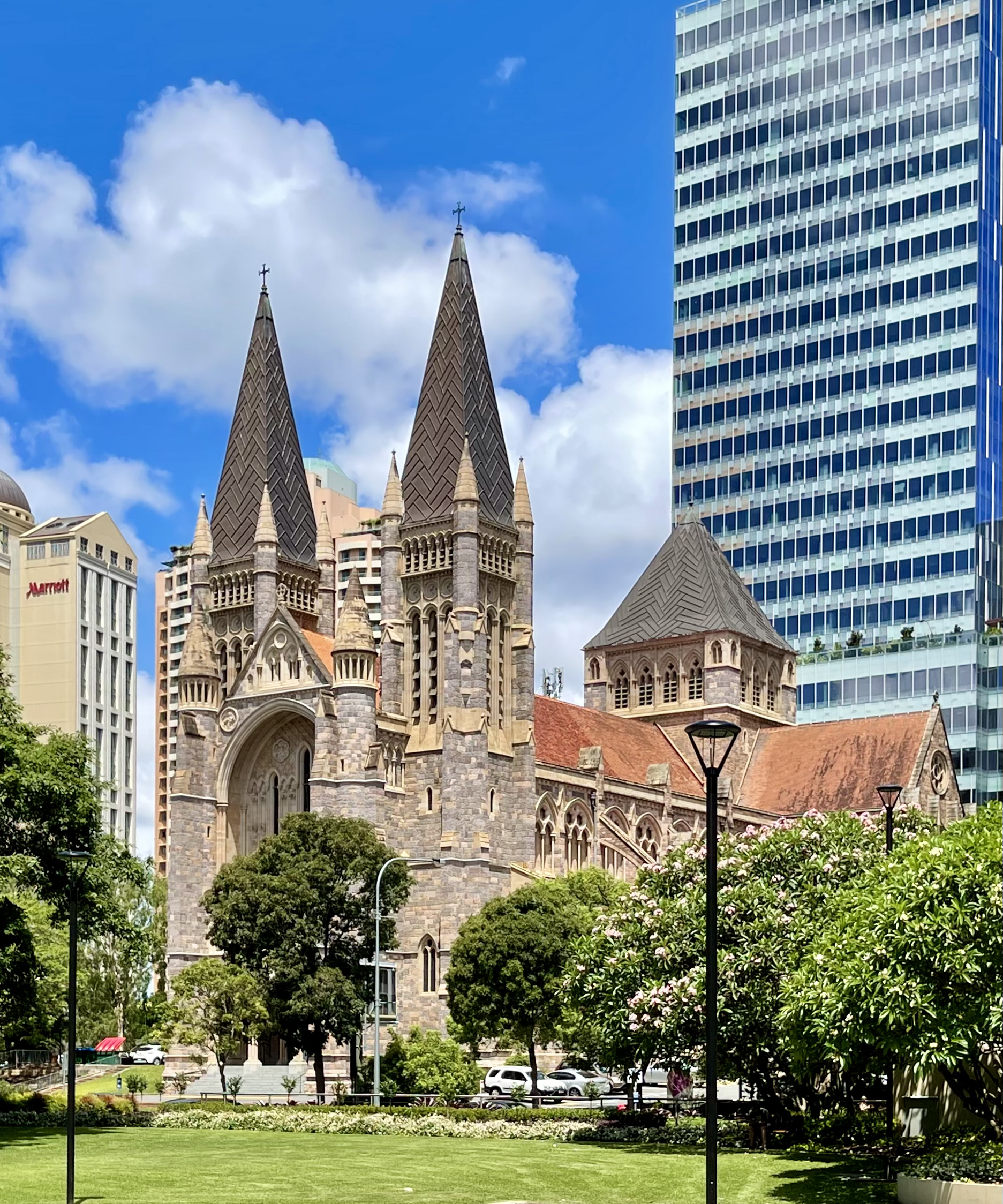
- Western façade from Cathedral Square.
- St John's Cathedral
- 27.46398°S 153.030061°E
- Location: 405 Ann Street, Brisbane, Queensland
- Country: Australia
- Denomination: Anglican Church of Australia
- Churchmanship: Broad church
- Website: stjohnscathedral.com.au

History
- Dedication: John the Evangelist
- Consecrated: 29 October 2009

Architecture
- Functional status: Active
- Architect: John Loughborough Pearson
- Style: Gothic Revival
- Groundbreaking: 1901
- Completed: 2009

Specifications
- Length: 79.2 metres (260 ft)
- Width: 37.0 metres (121.4 ft)
- Materials: Brisbane Tuff, sandstone

Administration
- Province: Queensland
- Diocese: Brisbane

Clergy
- Archbishop: Jeremy Greaves
- Dean: Peter Catt

St John's Cathedral is the cathedral of the Anglican Diocese of Brisbane and the metropolitan cathedral of the ecclesiastical province of Queensland, Australia. It is dedicated to St John the Evangelist. The cathedral is situated in Ann Street in the Brisbane central business district, and is the successor to an earlier pro-cathedral, which occupied part of the contemporary Queens Gardens on William Street, from 1854 to 1904. The cathedral is the second-oldest Anglican church in Brisbane, predated only by the extant All Saints church on Wickham Terrace (1862). The cathedral is listed on the Queensland Heritage Register.

The cathedral is the centre for big diocesan events such as the ordinations of priests and deacons which attract large congregations; a parish church catering for a diverse congregation of worshipers from around the city of Brisbane; a major centre for the arts and music with its own orchestra, the Camerata of St John's, which holds several concerts in the cathedral each year; and an international centre of pilgrimage attracting over 20,000 visitors annually from around the world.

The choir of men and boys sing the traditional Anglican repertoire as well as more adventurous fare. The cathedral also possesses a four manual pipe organ, the largest cathedral organ in Australia, which hosts many recitalists from across the world: Pearson's design (and stone-vaulting) creates a five-second reverberation making organ-music particularly resonant.

St John's Cathedral is unique in Australia as the completion of the building design was achieved through collaboration between clergy, stonemasons and architects over a period of almost 100 years, as with Romanesque and Gothic cathedrals in the Middle Ages and, more recently, 20th-century cathedrals such as Liverpool Cathedral in England, St John the Divine in New York and Washington National Cathedral in Washington DC.

== History ==
=== Vision and design ===
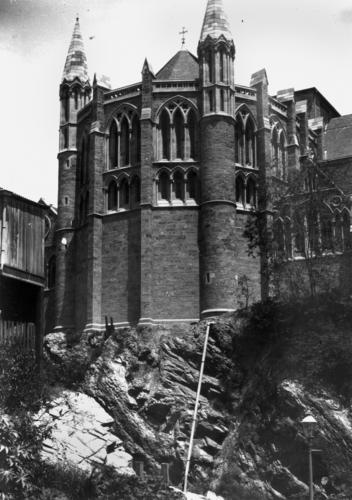
Apse from Adelaide Street c. 1910

William Webber – the third Bishop of Brisbane and previously a vicar in London – was instrumental in initiating the Brisbane cathedral project. In 1885–86, he commissioned John Loughborough Pearson to make sketch plans for Brisbane cathedral. The Brisbane cathedral movement began in earnest in 1887 as a celebration of Queen Victoria's Golden Jubilee – St John's was to be paid for by public subscription but the construction of the cathedral in one campaign was found to be financially impossible. As a result, the building has been executed in three stages over two centuries between 1906 and 2009.

In April 1889, Pearson's plans for the cathedral were approved for the original site bounded by George, Elizabeth and William Streets.

It was a cruciform church with a wide nave, double aisles, apse and ambulatory, short transepts about halfway along the length of the building and an apsidal side chapel on the north. The west front had towers close to the end of the nave. The upper part of the west wall was supported by a relieving arch, which continued the line of the interior cross arches. The towers had massive buttresses. Their strong vertical lines carried on into corner turrets set before pyramidal spires.

Pearson died in November 1897, two weeks before Webber presented fresh plans to the cathedral chapter. In 1898, Frank Loughborough Pearson (John Pearson's son and partner) was entrusted to carry out his father's design. In 1899, the cathedral chapter approved Pearson's revised plans only to be forced to reconsider the entire cathedral when the state government bought the original intended site. The present Ann Street site was purchased in late 1899 because it was "central, commodious and had the natural advantage of being able to make the building erected on it a landmark for miles around". Frank Loughborough Pearson spent a year reworking his father's design and, on 22 May 1901, the Duke of Cornwall and York (later King George V) laid the foundation stone of the cathedral. In 1903, Bishop William Webber died and in 1904 Frank Pearson submitted his final plans to the cathedral chapter.

=== First stage ===
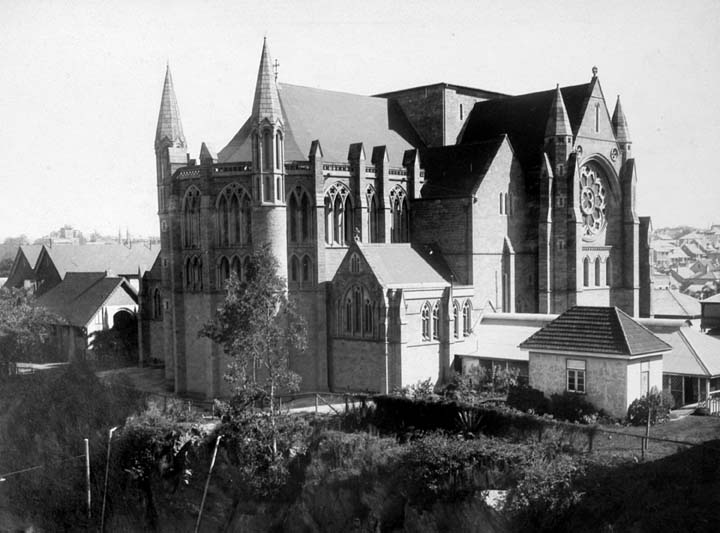
The apse and crossing in 1927

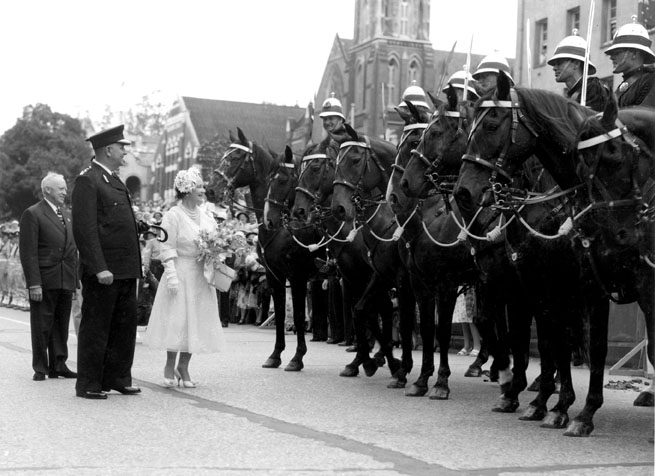
Her Majesty Queen Elizabeth the Queen Mother at St Johns Cathedral, 1958

The first stage of construction began in 1906 and took four years to complete. This included the chancel, sanctuary and ambulatory, the quire and its aisles, the transepts and crossing, the Lady Chapel to the liturgical north of the quire, the double aisles and the first bay of the nave. This first stage was consecrated as the Anglican Cathedral of St John the Evangelist on Friday 28 October 1910. (The building was re-consecrated after each stage of its construction.)

=== Second stage ===
After World War II money was raised in the hope of completing the cathedral as a war memorial. In 1947, Field-Marshal Viscount Montgomery of Alamein laid a foundation stone for a further two bays of the nave, but construction ceased after the laying of the foundations.

In 1965 the second stage was commenced. Work on the second stage proceeded for a further four years and consisted of the laying of foundations for the extensions, a two-bay extension to the nave and demolition and removal of the temporary west wall.

=== Third stage ===
The third stage of construction commenced in 1989 and was completed in 2009 (with the exception of 29 life-sized statues on the west front and a set of cloisters on the north side of the cathedral which have yet to be commissioned). The third stage of construction comprised the erection of the south west porch, the final bay of the nave, the west front, the north and south towers and the central tower. This stage of work was overseen by Peter Dare, Master Mason of Exeter Cathedral in England and carried out by stonemasons from Wagners. To ensure enough supply of sandstone for the project, the cathedral authorities purchased a sandstone quarry at Helidon, 100 kilometres (62 mi) from Brisbane where each piece of stone was cut and finished and then trucked to the cathedral site in Ann Street. The quarry was sold in 2012 for $250,000.

The third stage of construction cost A$40 million which was raised by public donations, bequests and grants from the federal, state and local governments.

The copper-clad western spires were lifted into position on 1 March 2008 and subsequently blessed by Bishop John Parkes.

In 2009 as part of the Q150 celebrations, St John's Cathedral was announced as one of the Q150 Icons of Queensland for its role as a "structure and engineering feat".

=== Consecration ===
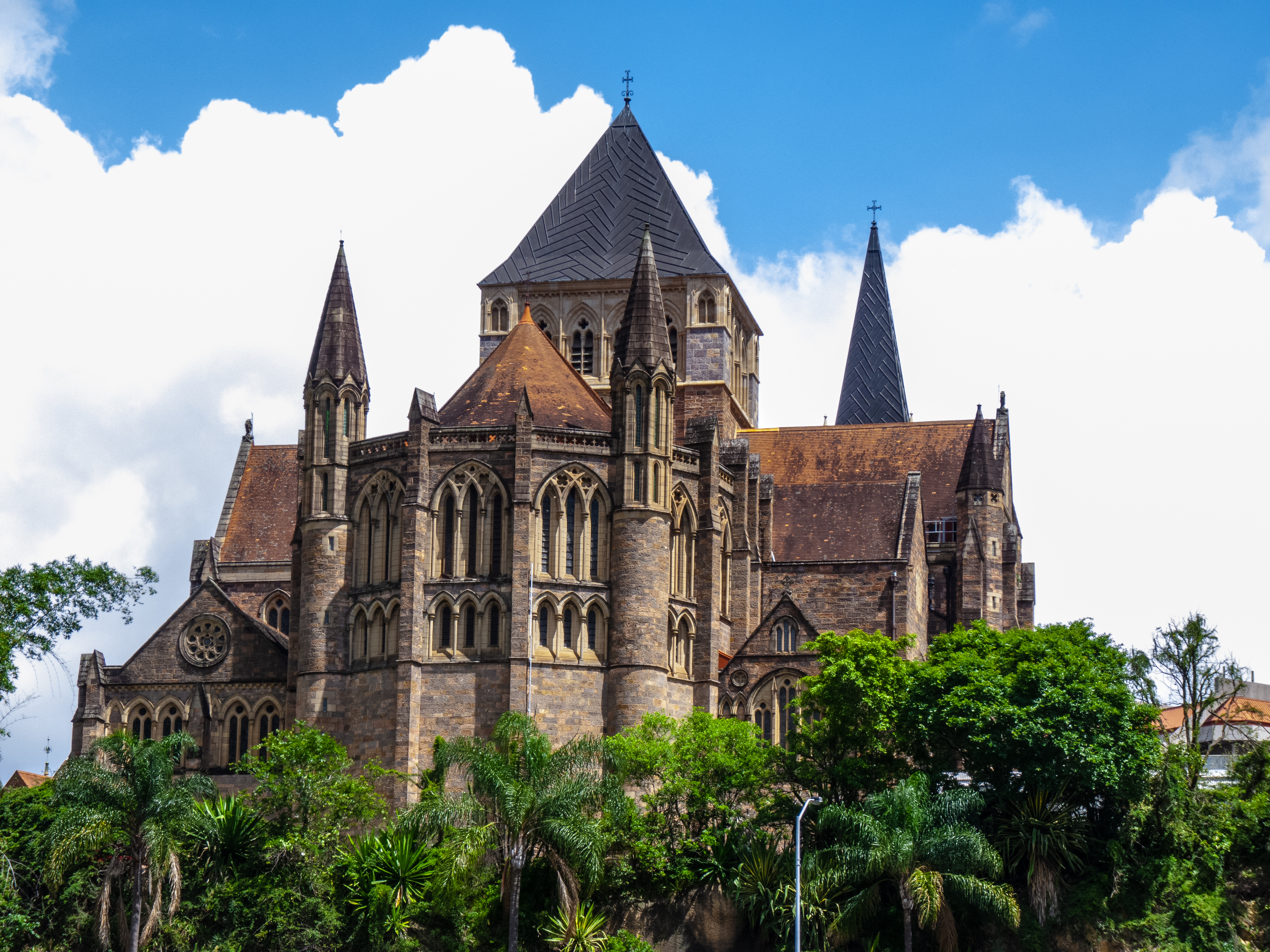
St John's Cathedral East End from Queen Street, 2010

The Archbishop of Brisbane, Phillip Aspinall, officially reconsecrated the completed cathedral on 29 October 2009, attended by about 1,500 people, 108 years after the laying of the foundation stone.

On 27 November 2014, a hailstorm struck Brisbane causing widespread damage throughout the city totaling $1.1 billion. St John's Cathedral suffered extensive damage to its roof-tiles and leadlights, as well as damage to the copper sheeting on the front spires and the southern and eastern sides of the bell tower. The cathedral's eastern wall had also bowed approximately 2.5 mm from the force of the wind, leaving it in danger of structural failure. Restoration repairs commenced in early June 2015, and were not completed until November 2018.

In 2015, a series of statues carved by Rhyl Hinwood, costing $45,000 each, were purchased and blessed by Archbishop Aspinall before being installed on the cathedral's facade.

On 20 September 2022, St John's Cathedral held a service of thanksgiving marking the reign of Elizabeth II, Queen of Australia.

== Design elements ==
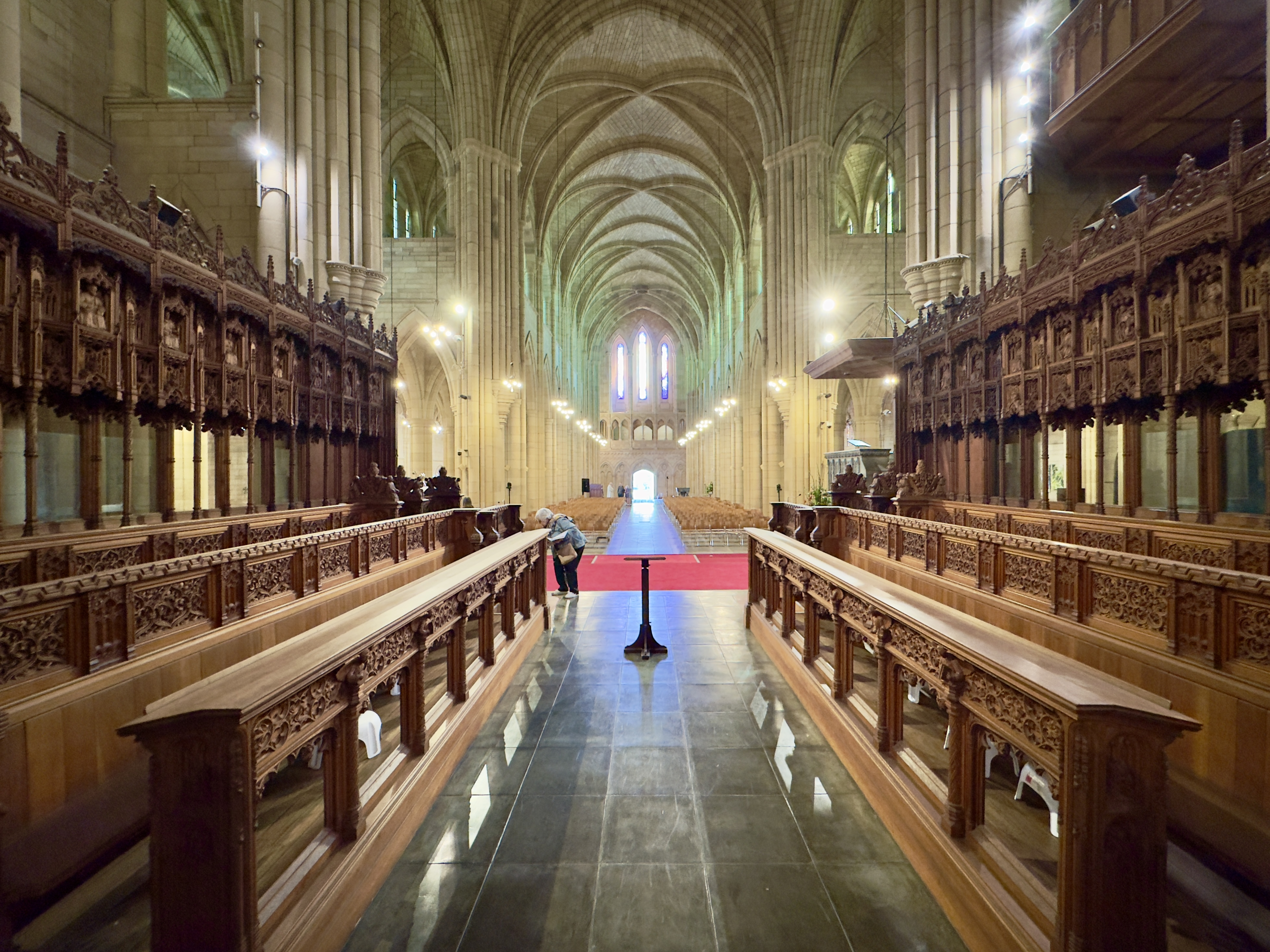
Nave facing liturgical west

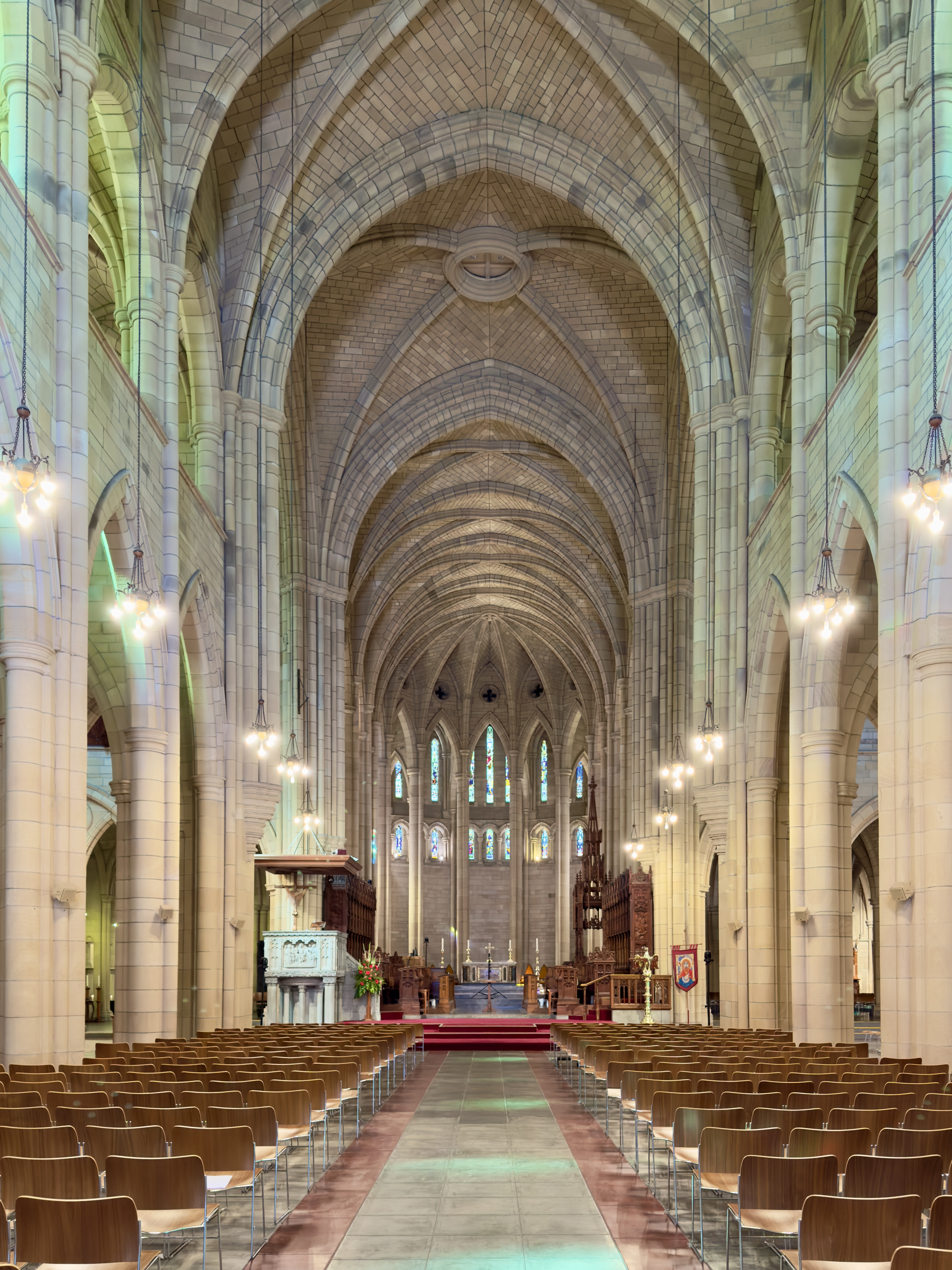
Nave and altar of St John's Cathedral

The cathedral was designed in the Gothic Revival style by John Loughborough Pearson, one of England's leading church architects of the late 19th century and bears similarities to Truro Cathedral in Cornwall, also designed by Pearson, although the architecture of St John's is more decidedly French Gothic in inspiration. The external walls are of randomly arranged brown, pink and mauve Brisbane tuff stone from the O’Connelltown Quarry in the (now) suburb of Windsor, while the interior is primarily dressed sandstone (Helidon freestone) from Helidon near Toowoomba. The granite and basalt used in the foundations and at the base of the columns came from Harcourt and Footscray in Victoria and the sandstone for the window dressings, doorways and arcading came from Pyrmont, New South Wales.

The initial architectural impact is achieved via its lofty ceilings, tall and delicately proportioned columns and low level lighting. The architects achieve a layering effect through the masking of external walls via colonnades (a colonnade denotes a long sequence of columns joined by their entablature which is the superstructure of mouldings and bands which lies horizontally above the columns) often free-standing. The interior (by Frank Loughborough Pearson) reflects liturgical arrangements favoured by the Oxford movement from the 1840s. The design of the central nave toward the east end was reworked by Frank Pearson (1898–1904). He lengthened the nave and exchanged the lancet windows in the north transept for a rose window, simplified the details of the east end and omitted much of the cathedral's internal decoration to meet financial constraints. The north and south aisles, representing a bird's folded wings, are separated from the nave, or body, by Pearson's slender piers. The nave terminates at the crossing. The central tower rests on four large piers and is directly above. The north and south transepts (the transverse part of a cruciform church, crossing the nave at right angles) representing outstretched arms are to the left and right and the most sacred part of the cathedral is ahead.

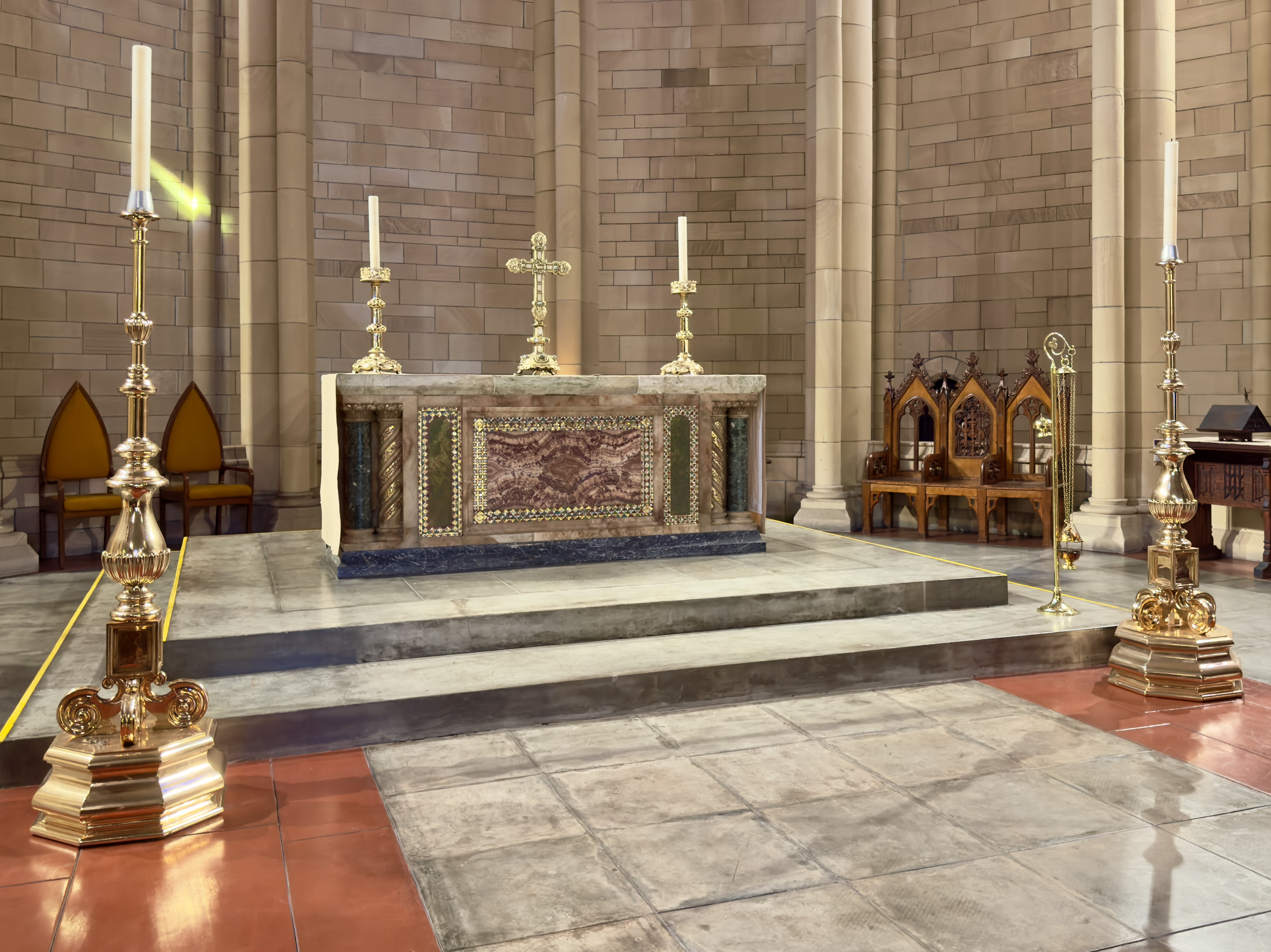
High altar

In many respects, the architecture of St John's resembles the great Cistercian abbey churches of 12th and 13th century Europe. The Cistercian monks believed that church architecture should be simple and utilitarian and also preferably made of stone, relying for its effects upon simple elegance of design, noble proportions and the natural qualities of the materials. This can be seen in St John's in the atmosphere of the building created by the mass of stone pillars, ceilings and arches, the quality of the sandstone and the basic simplicity of the design and, apart from the west front, minimal ornamentation.

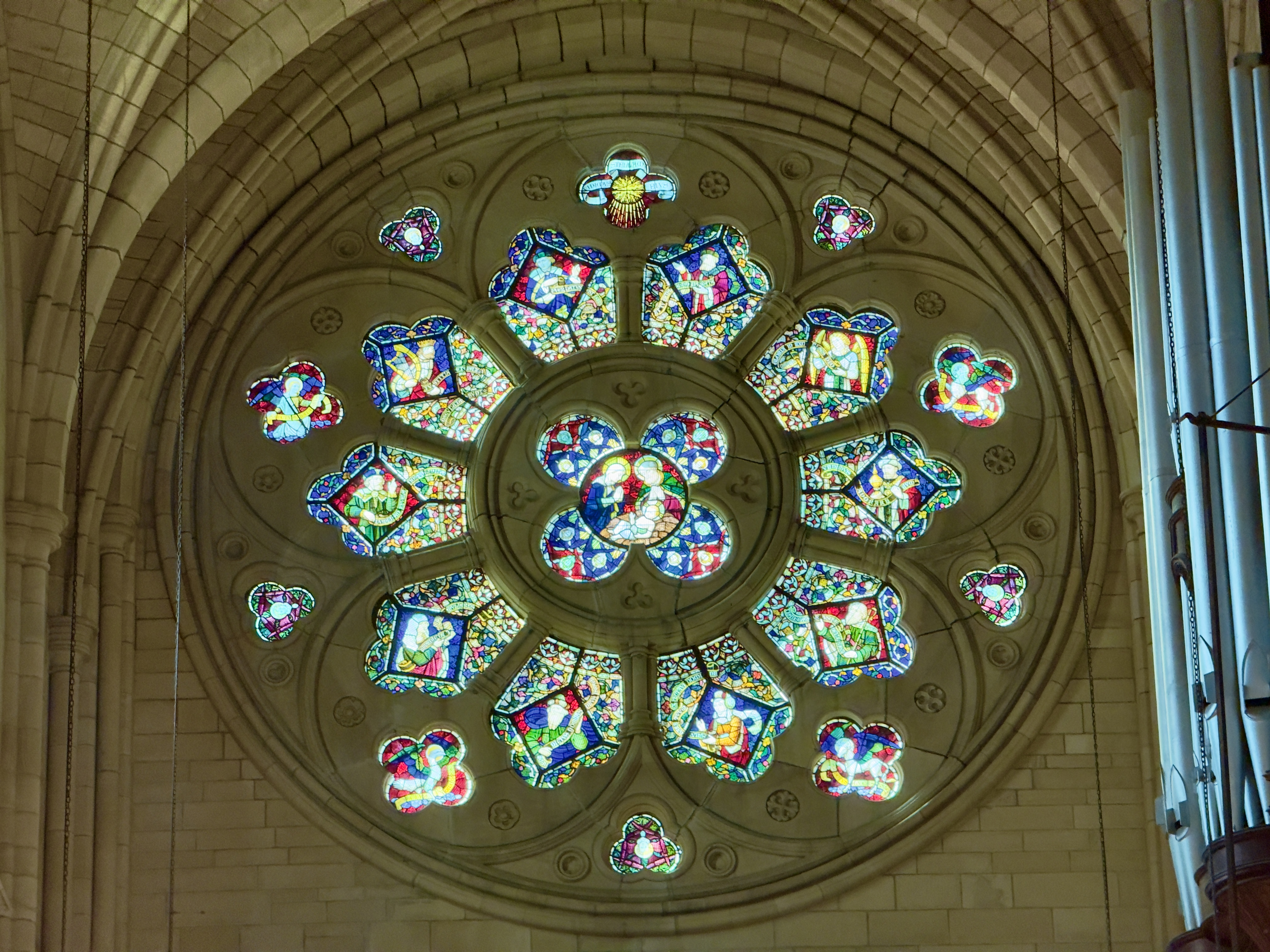
The Rose Window

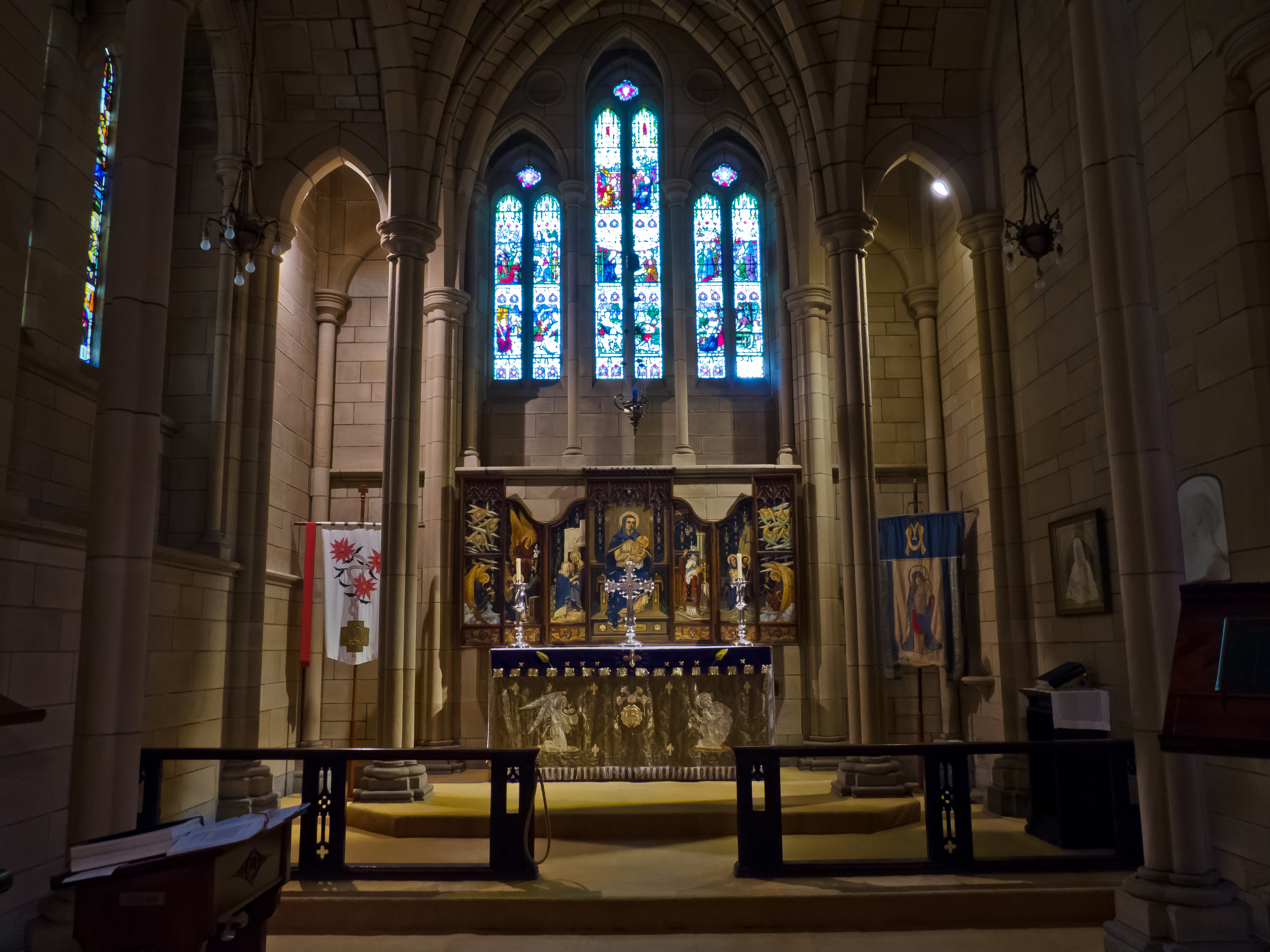
The Lady Chapel

According to Cleary, Pearson's elevated choir symbolically marks the passage from the secular nave into the higher and more holy choir. Here the clergy are also accommodated in their "elaborately carved" stalls and the archbishop's throne or cathedra (symbolising the archbishop's authority and pastoral responsibilities) – designed by Pearson resides. The episcopal throne was carved in situ by Brisbane carver and cabinet maker Hedley Smith in the 1930s. Two statuettes by Smith were added in 1948.

Beyond the choir is the presbytery and then the high altar and its surrounding sanctuary. The high altar is a free-standing structure with a great Byzantine-style stone baldacchino (a permanent ornamental canopy, as above a freestanding altar or throne), rather than a reredos, (a screen or a decorated part of the wall behind an altar in a church) supported on columns planned to rise high above it. Beneath the high altar lie the remains of Bishop Webber.

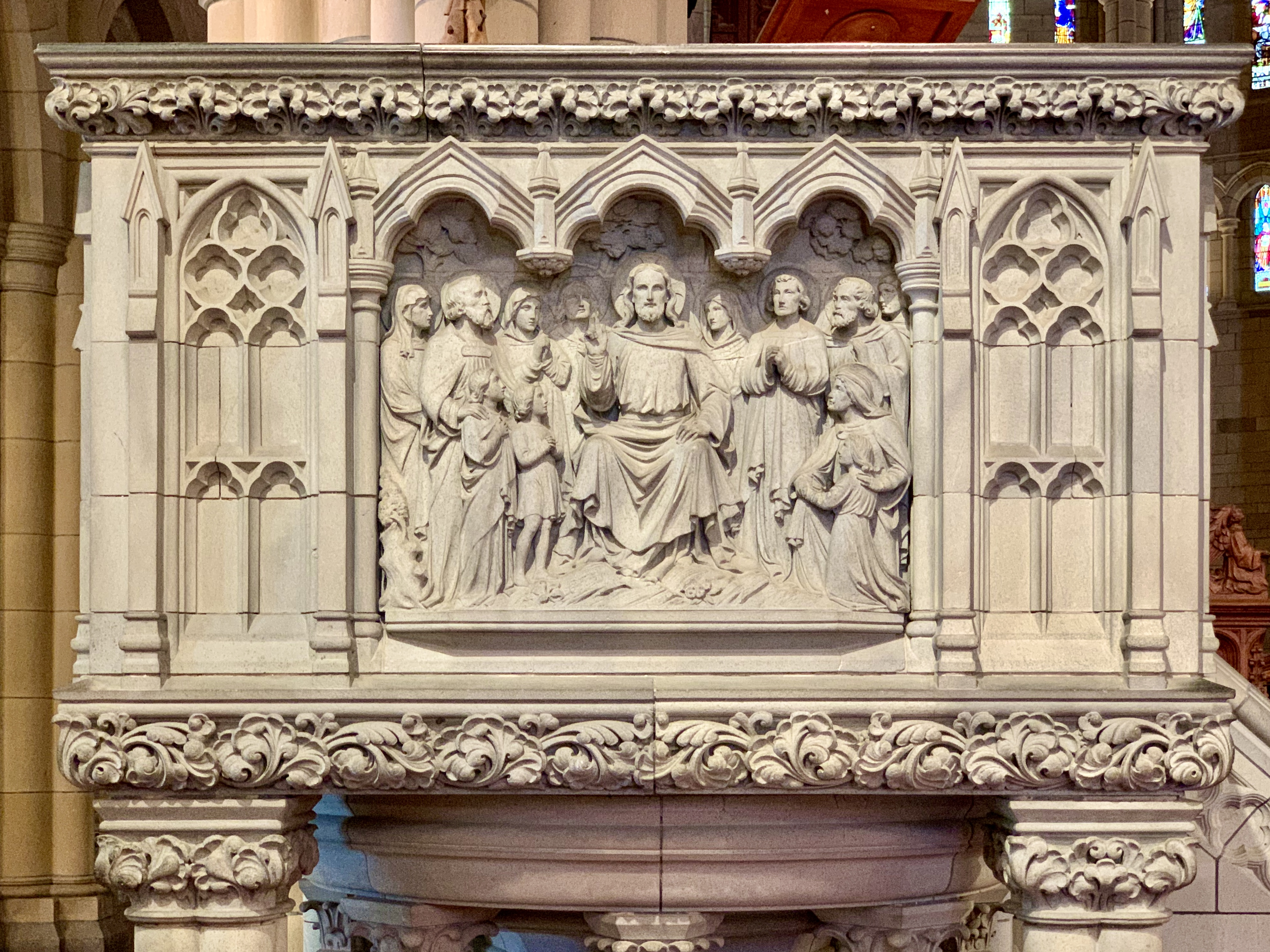
Pulpit at St John's Cathedral

However, as yet the baldacchino has not been constructed. In front of the altar in the sanctuary floor are two pieces of mosaic from the Holy Land, brought back after being uncovered during the First World War by the Australian Light Horse Regiment. One of these is part of the floor of a 6th-century synagogue at Jericho. The other is a fragment from the floor of a 6th-century Christian church at Gaza and is part of a larger mosaic now housed in the Australian War Memorial in Canberra. Beyond the high altar the cathedral ends in a semicircular apse and ambulatory (processional aisle), a link to the architecture's French-Norman past. Many features beyond the crossing including the altar, cross, candle sticks, pulpit, canopy, clergy stalls, pendant lights and litany desk were designed by Frank Pearson. He also designed the carved organ case and the rose window in the north transept.

Many Brisbane architects were commissioned to design liturgical furniture for the cathedral's three chapels, the Lady Chapel, the Chapel of the Holy Spirit and the Chapel of the Holy Sacrament.

The initial design called for a galvanised iron roof; this was changed to terracotta roof tiles in 1907. The resolution of unfinished design elements continues to pose challenges.

Pews are being replaced by free-standing chairs. The baptismal font, previously in the north transept, has been moved to the west end of the nave.

== Bells ==
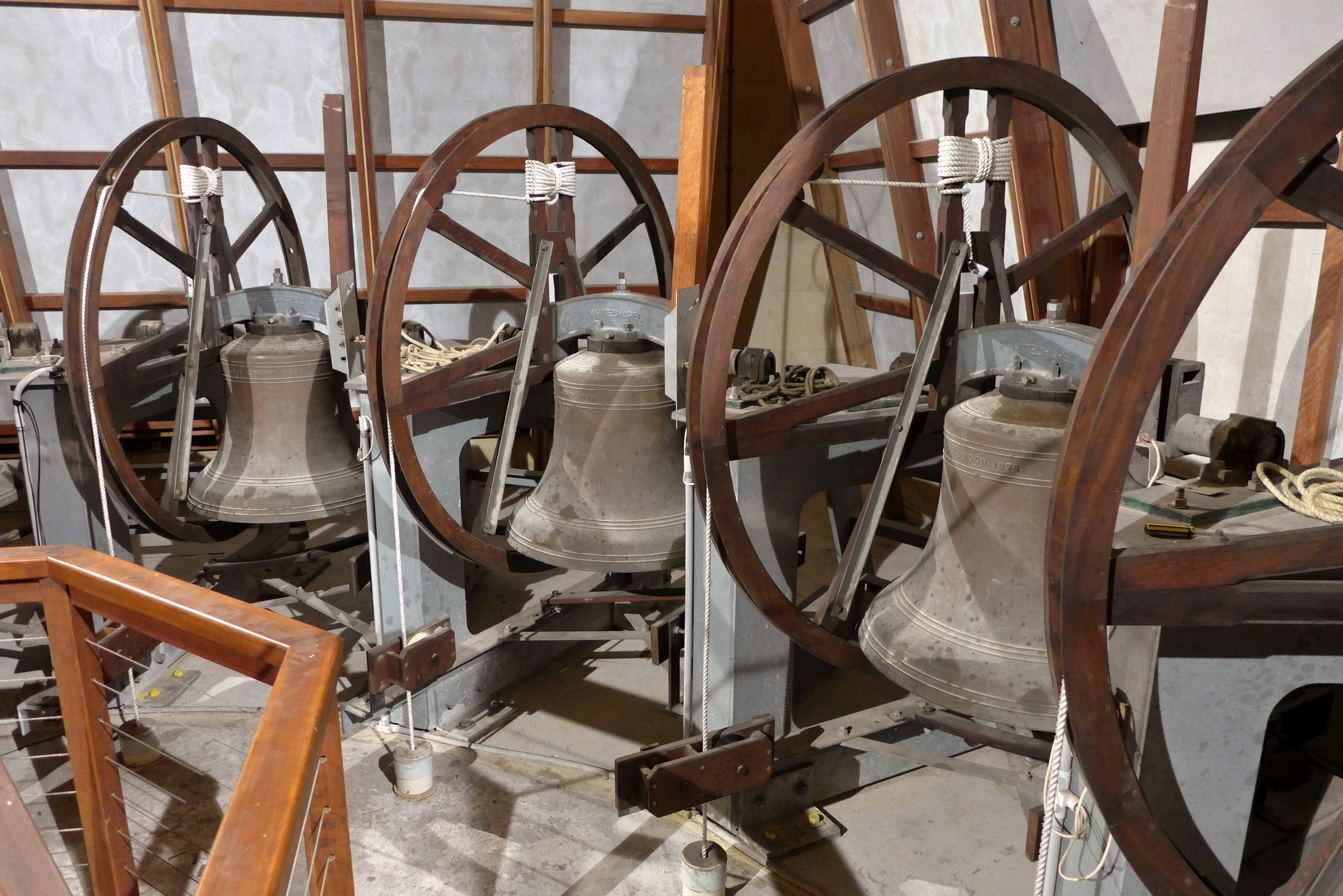
Interior of the bell tower

The cathedral has a peal of 12 bells hung for full circle ringing with the tenor weighing 16 hundredweight. The first bells were made by John Warner & Sons in 1876 with funds raised by public subscription. Ringing takes place before the 9:30 am Sunday service, to mark special occasions, and for weddings. The bells are rung by members of the Australian and New Zealand Association of Bellringers. The bell tower is equipped with sound control and electronic simulator equipment which is utilised for Monday night ringing practice and to aid in the teaching of new ringers. The bells are named after deans and administrators of the cathedral since 1925 when the role was separated from that of the Bishop of Brisbane. Bell names, weights, and pitch are listed as follows:

Number	Name	Mass			Pitch
Number	Name	long measure	lb	kg	Pitch
1 (Treble)	John	4 long cwt 3 qr 8 lb	540	245	B
2	David	5 long cwt 0 qr 26 lb	586	266	A
3	Francis	5 long cwt 1 qr 2 lb	590	268	G#
4	Horace	5 long cwt 2 qr 6 lb	622	282	F#
5	William	5 long cwt 3 qr 12 lb	656	298	E
6	Denis	6 long cwt 2 qr 0 lb	728	330	D#
7	William Pye	6 long cwt 3 qr 16 lb	772	350	C#
8	Cecil	7 long cwt 2 qr 13 lb	853	387	B
9	Ian	9 long cwt 1 qr 7 lb	1,043	473	A
10	Ralph	11 long cwt 1 qr 20 lb	1,280	581	G#
11	Robert	12 long cwt 1 qr 20 lb	1,392	631	F#
12 (Tenor)	Arthur	16 long cwt 1 qr 17 lb	1,837	833	E

== Other buildings ==
Buildings associated with St John's include Webber House, Church House, The Deanery (formerly Adelaide House) and St Martin's House. These buildings provide the traditional experience of only having a full view of the cathedral when quite close (after having wound one's way through narrow medieval city streets) thus adding to the impact and feeling of grandeur.

=== Webber House ===
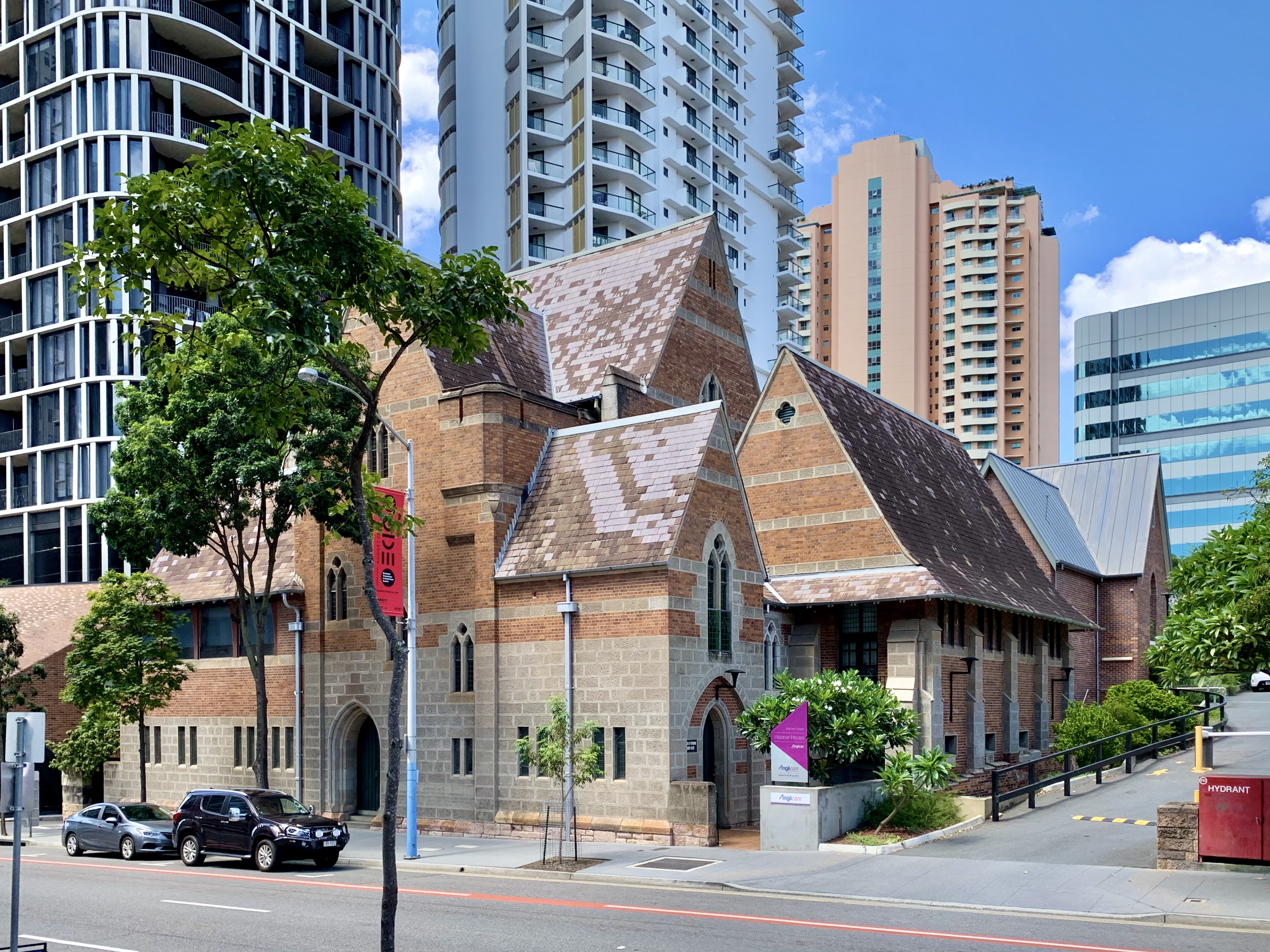
Webber House, 2020

Webber House was built in 1904. It was designed by Robin Dods (1868–1920). The stone used in the Webber house came from the old St John's Pro-Cathedral in William Street. Webber House was formerly known as School House and housed St John's Primary School until 1941. The school went on to become Anglican Church Grammar School.

=== Church House ===
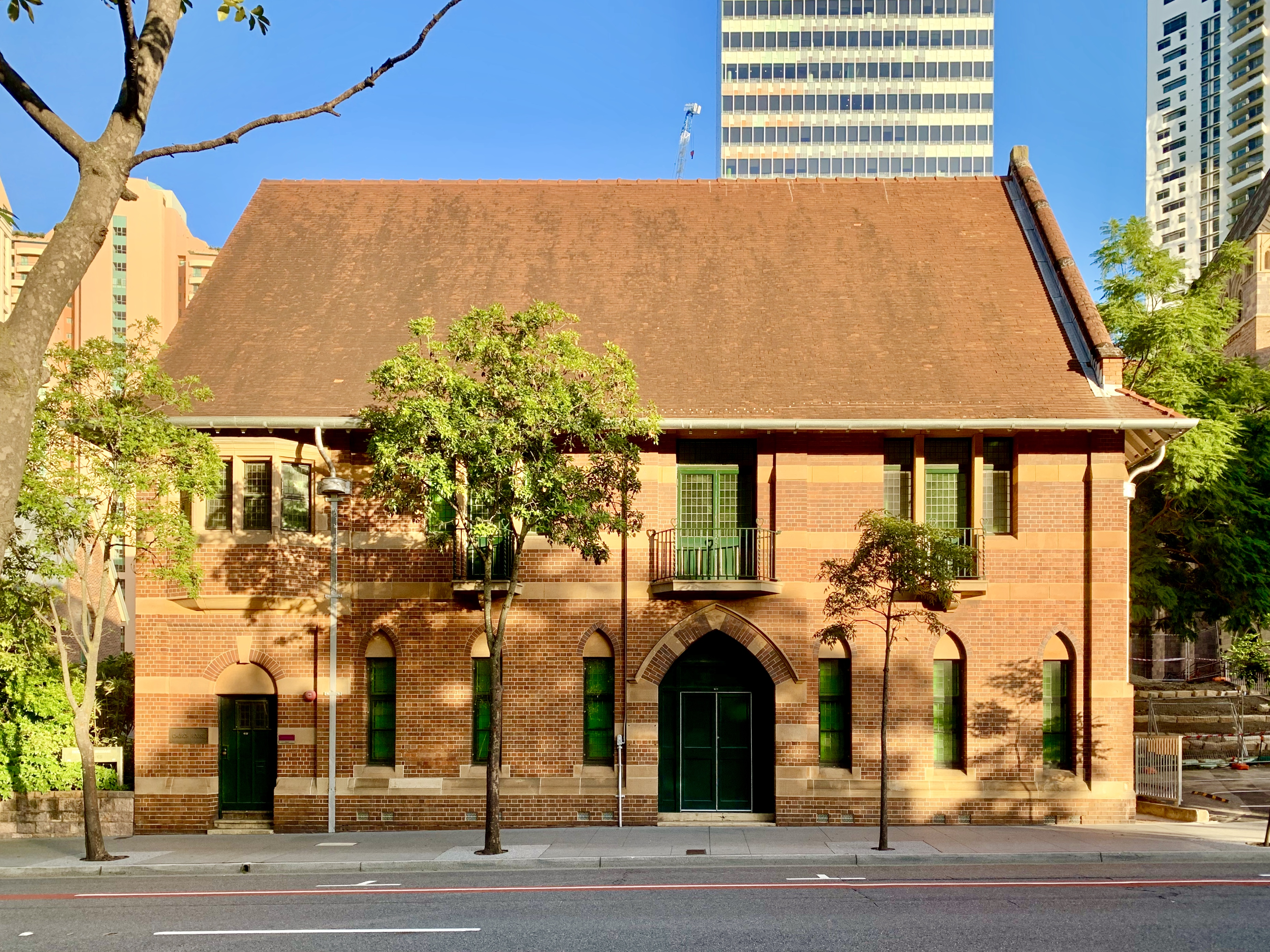
Church House, 2020

Church House was built in 1909. Also designed by Robin Dods and was designed to conform to Pearson's concept of St John's Cathedral and its traditional cathedral setting. (The heart design found in many of Dods' buildings can be seen on the iron gates.) Both are Gothic in overall form and design, having details mainly in the style of Art Nouveau. They have been placed to conceal a view of the cathedral from a northerly approach.

=== Adelaide House ===
The oldest building in the precinct is The Deanery, also known as called Adelaide House, built in 1853. From the verandah of this building the first Governor of Queensland, Sir George Bowen, read the proclamation declaring Queensland a separate colony on 10 December 1859. The building then became Queensland's first government house.

=== St Martin's House ===
The other more eclectic building with Gothic touches found in the precinct is St Martin's House, formerly St Martin's Hospital. It was built as a war memorial after World War I and is dedicated to St Martin of Tours as 11 November (Remembrance Day) is his feast day. Designed by Lang Powell the design was strongly influenced by the cathedral and adjacent buildings. This is evident through the choice of building materials, roof forms and architectural motifs. St Martin's is sited to protect St John's from noise and visual intrusion from the city and forms a quiet courtyard beside the cathedral. St Martin's shows similarities to the "Red Brick House" designed by Philip Webb for William Morris.

== Deans of Brisbane ==
The role of dean was separated from that of bishop in 1925.

- 2008–present: Peter Charles Catt (previously Dean of Grafton)
- 2004–2008: Anthony John Parkes (afterwards Bishop of Wangaratta, 2008)
- 1999-2003: David Thomas
- 1985–1998: Arthur John Grimshaw
- 1983–1985: Robert Butterss (afterwards assistant bishop, Melbourne, 1985–1993)
- 1973–1981: Ian Gordon Combe George (afterwards Archdeacon of Canberra, 1981)
- 1967–1972: Cecil Emerson Barron Muschamp (previously Bishop of Kalgoorlie, 1950–1967)
- 1958–1967: William Pye Baddeley
- 1932–1952: William Edward Colvile Barrett
- 1931–1932: Horace Henry Dixon (previously headmaster of The Southport School, 1901–1929, and afterwards assistant bishop of Brisbane, 1932–1961)
- 1925–1931: Francis de Witt Batty (afterwards Bishop of Newcastle, 1931)

== See also ==
- List of new ecclesiastical buildings by J. L. Pearson
- List of cathedrals in Australia
