= Ann Street, Brisbane =

Street in Brisbane, Queensland

Ann Street Queensland
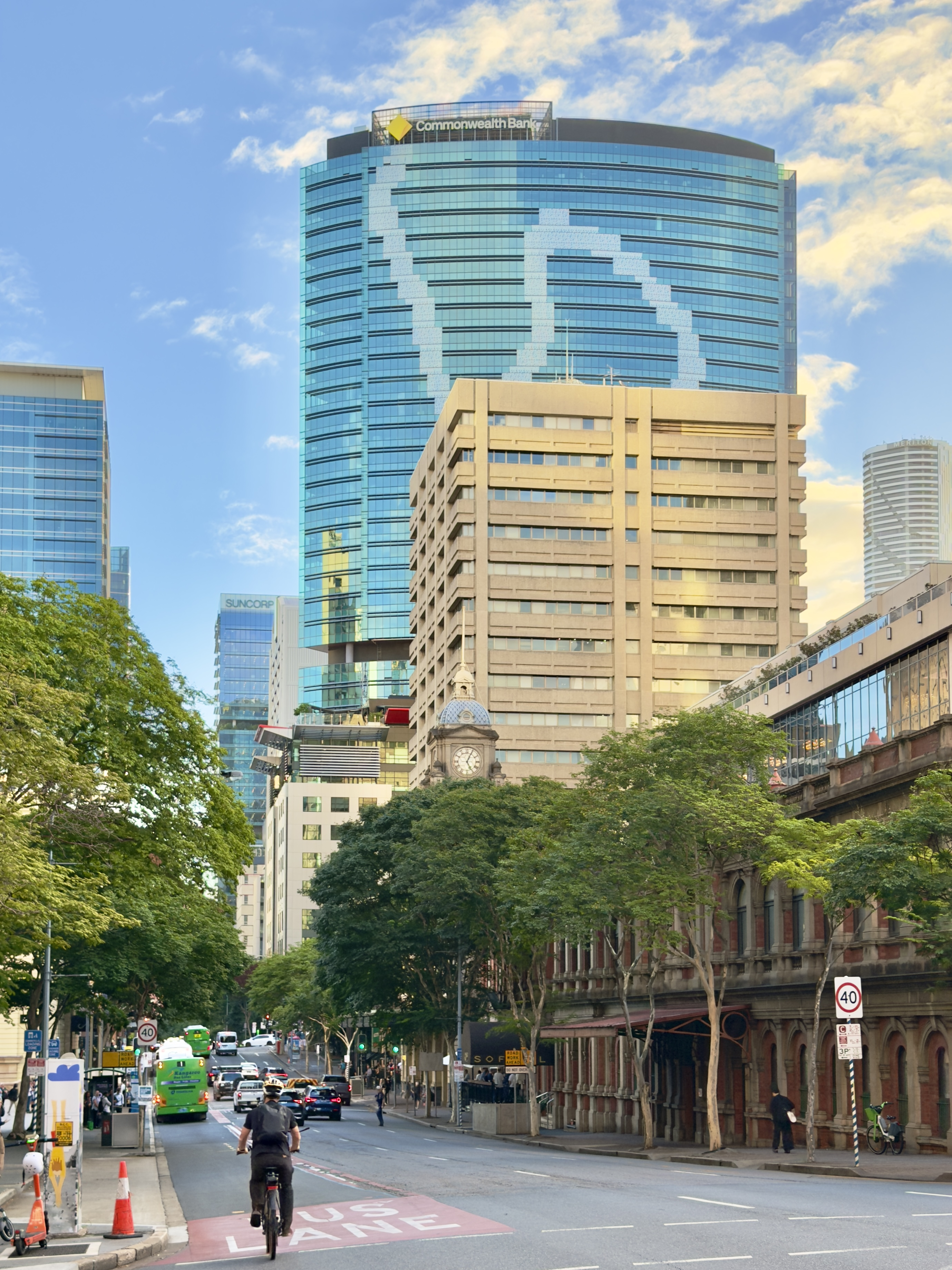
- Ann Street, Central Station on the right
- Coordinates: 27.4608°S 153.0327°E

General information
- Type: Street
- Location: Brisbane
- Length: 3 km (1.9 mi)

Major junctions
- Southwest end: Riverside Expressway
- North Quay; George Street; Roma Street; Albert Street; Edward Street; Creek Street; Wharf Street; Queen Street; Boundary Street; Gipps Street / Kemp Place; Brunswick Street; East Street / James Street; Murri Way / Commercial Road
- Northeast end: Montpelier Road / Skyring Terrace

Location(s)
- LGA(s): City of Brisbane
- Major suburbs: Brisbane CBD; Fortitude Valley

Restrictions
- General: One-way traffic NE–SW (city-bound)

Ann Street is a major four-lane, one-way street in Brisbane, Queensland, Australia. It runs parallel to Adelaide Street and is the northernmost street in the central business district. The street is named for Anne, Queen of Great Britain, and is one of a number of streets in the Brisbane CBD named for female royals. It is a major thoroughfare, linking the suburb of Fortitude Valley in the northeast with the Riverside Expressway in the southwest. Address numbers run in the opposite direction (southwest to northeast).

Key buildings and public spaces along Ann Street include the State Law Building, Central Railway Station, Brisbane City Hall, King George Square, King George Central, as well as ANZAC Square and the Shrine of Remembrance (both of which commemorate Australia's and New Zealand's war dead). The now-demolished Canberra Hotel (1929–1987) was located on the corner of Ann and Edward Streets.

Each year, on Anzac Day (25 April), a dawn memorial service is held at the Shrine of Remembrance, with wreaths being laid around the eternal flame in memory of those who died in war. There is also a memorial service held each year on Armistice Day (11 November) and wreaths are again laid at the eternal flame. The shrine was dedicated on Armistice Day in 1930.

King George Square busway station has entrances from King George Square and is accessible from Ann Street.

Ann Street is home to several historic Brisbane churches including St John's Cathedral, Ann Street Church of Christ and St Andrew's Uniting Church. Access to some facilities of All Saints Anglican Church is from Ann Street.

== Major intersections ==
- Riverside Expressway
- North Quay
- George Street
- Roma Street
- Albert Street
- Edward Street
- Creek Street
- Wharf Street
- Queen Street
- Boundary Street
- Gipps Street / Kemp Place
- Brunswick Street
- East Street / James Street
- Murri Way / Commercial Road
- Montpelier Road / Skyring Terrace

== History ==
The United Methodist Free Church opened a church in Ann Street near Wharf Street on Sunday 22 March 1863.

A congregation of the Church of Christ was established on 23 September 1883 in the Brisbane central area. In the late 1890s the congregation purchased 430 Ann Street (27.4628°S 153.0302°E) purchased from the United Methodist Free Church to establish their first church, still operating as at 2021 under the name Your Church.

The Canberra Hotel, erected by the Queensland Prohibition League on the western corner of Ann and Edward Streets, was opened on 20 July 1929 and demolished in 1987.

== Heritage listings ==
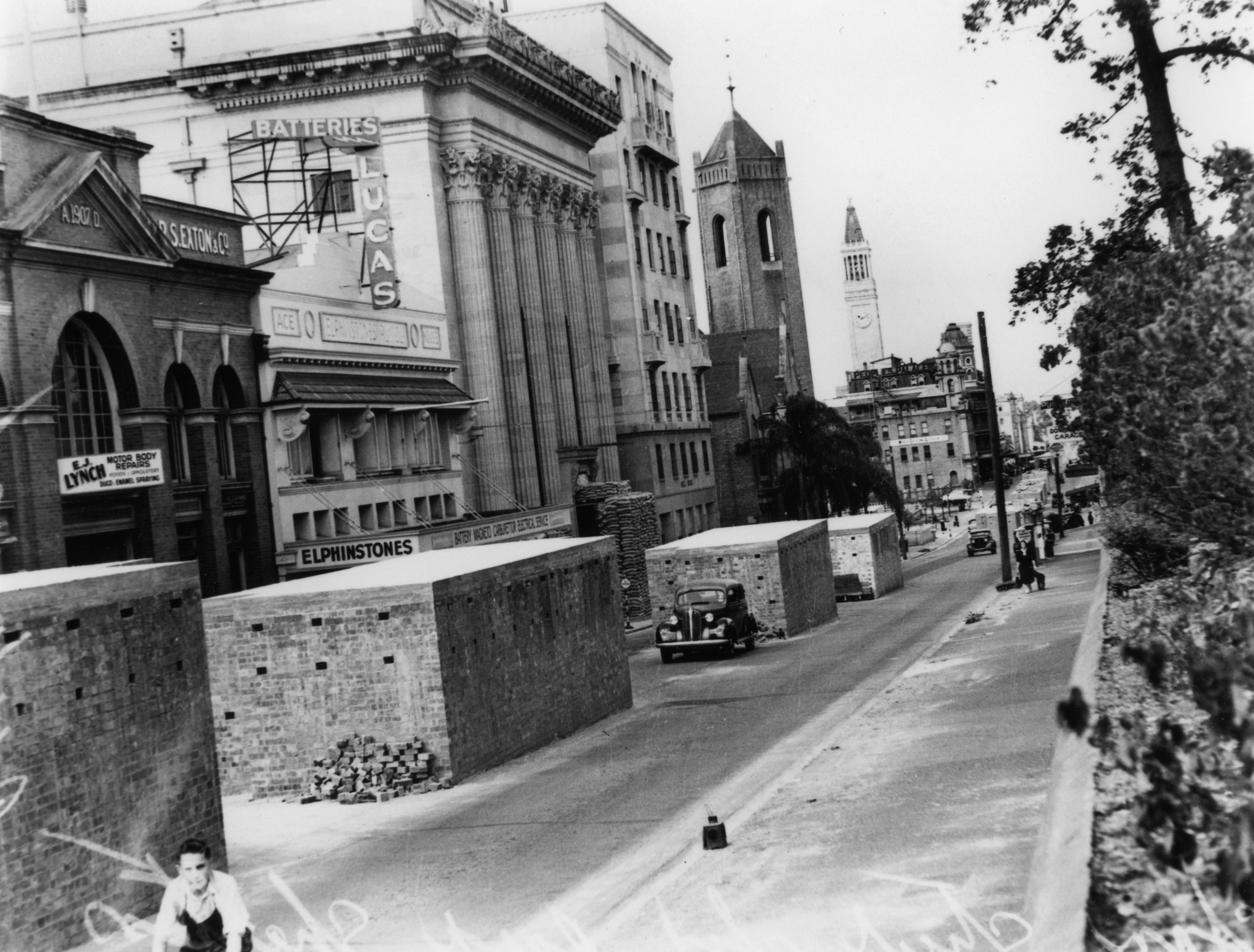
Air raid shelters on Ann Street, 1942; the Masonic Temple, Shell House, St Andrew's Uniting Church, and the tower of City Hall on the left

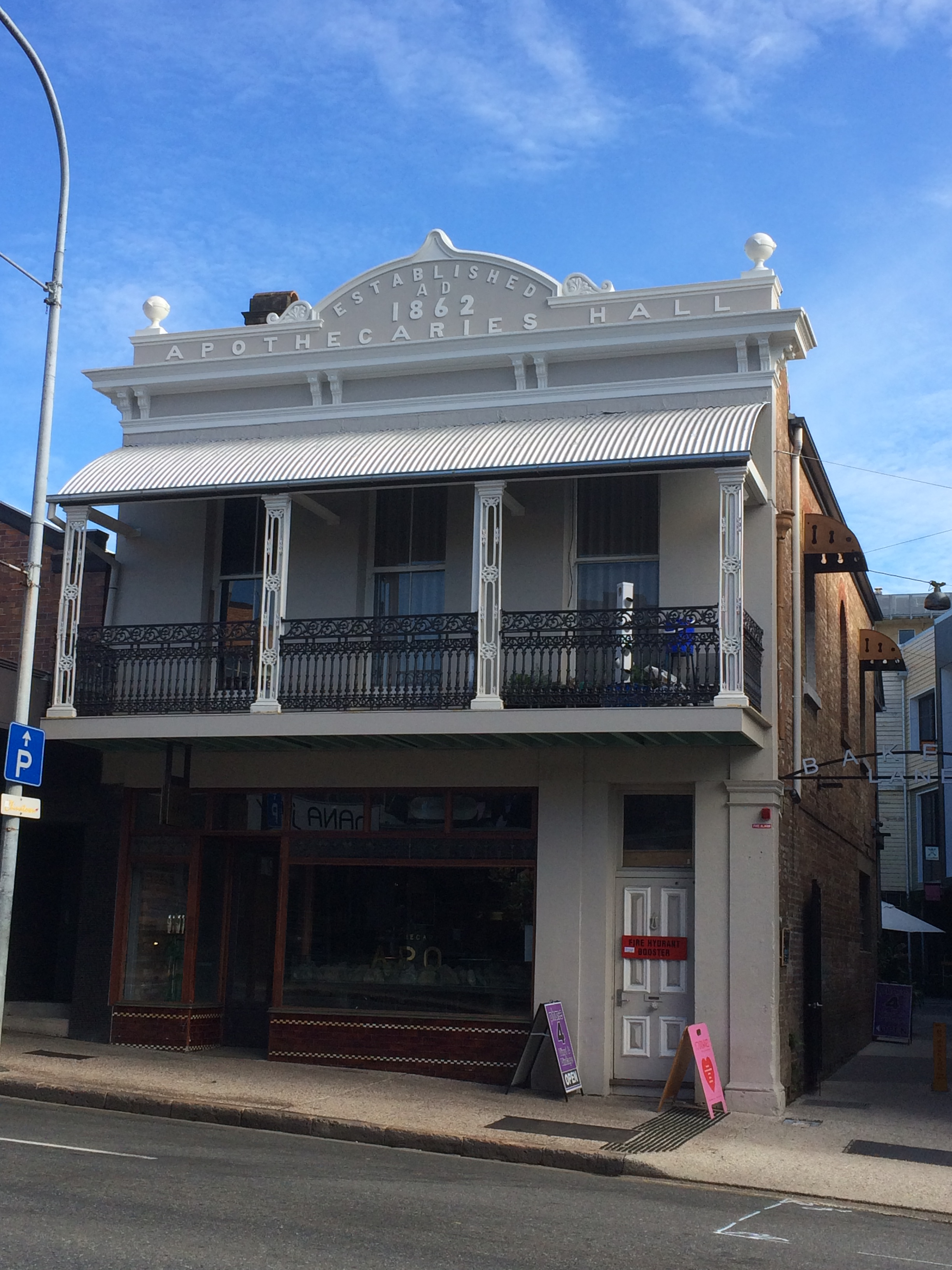
Apothecaries Hall, 690 Ann Street

Ann Street has a number of heritage-listed sites, including:

- 141 Ann Street: Ann Street Presbyterian Church
- 166 Ann Street: Brisbane School of Arts
- 255A Ann Street: ANZAC Square Arcade (former Queensland Government Offices, also known as Anzac Square Building)
- 270 Ann Street: Central Railway Station
- 301 Ann Street: Shell House
- 311 Ann Street: Masonic Temple
- 333 Ann Street: former RS Exton and Co Building
- 373 Ann Street: St Martin's House
- 413 Ann Street: St John's Cathedral
- 417 Ann Street: Church House (The Deanery)
- 417 Ann Street: The Deanery
- 439 Ann Street: Webber House
- 501 Ann Street: Queensland Brewery Company Building
- 547 Ann Street: All Hallows' School Buildings
- 690 Ann Street: Apothecaries Hall
- 740 Ann Street: former Fortitude Valley Post Office
- 131 Creek Street: St Andrews Uniting Church (on the corner of Ann Street)
- 308 Edward Street: People's Palace (on the corner with Ann Street)
- 560 Queen Street: Orient Hotel (on the corner of Ann Street)
- 85 Wickham Street: Centenary Place (also borders Ann Street)

== See also ==
- 160 Ann Street, Brisbane
