= St Luke's Church of England, Brisbane =

Heritage-listed building in Brisbane, Queensland

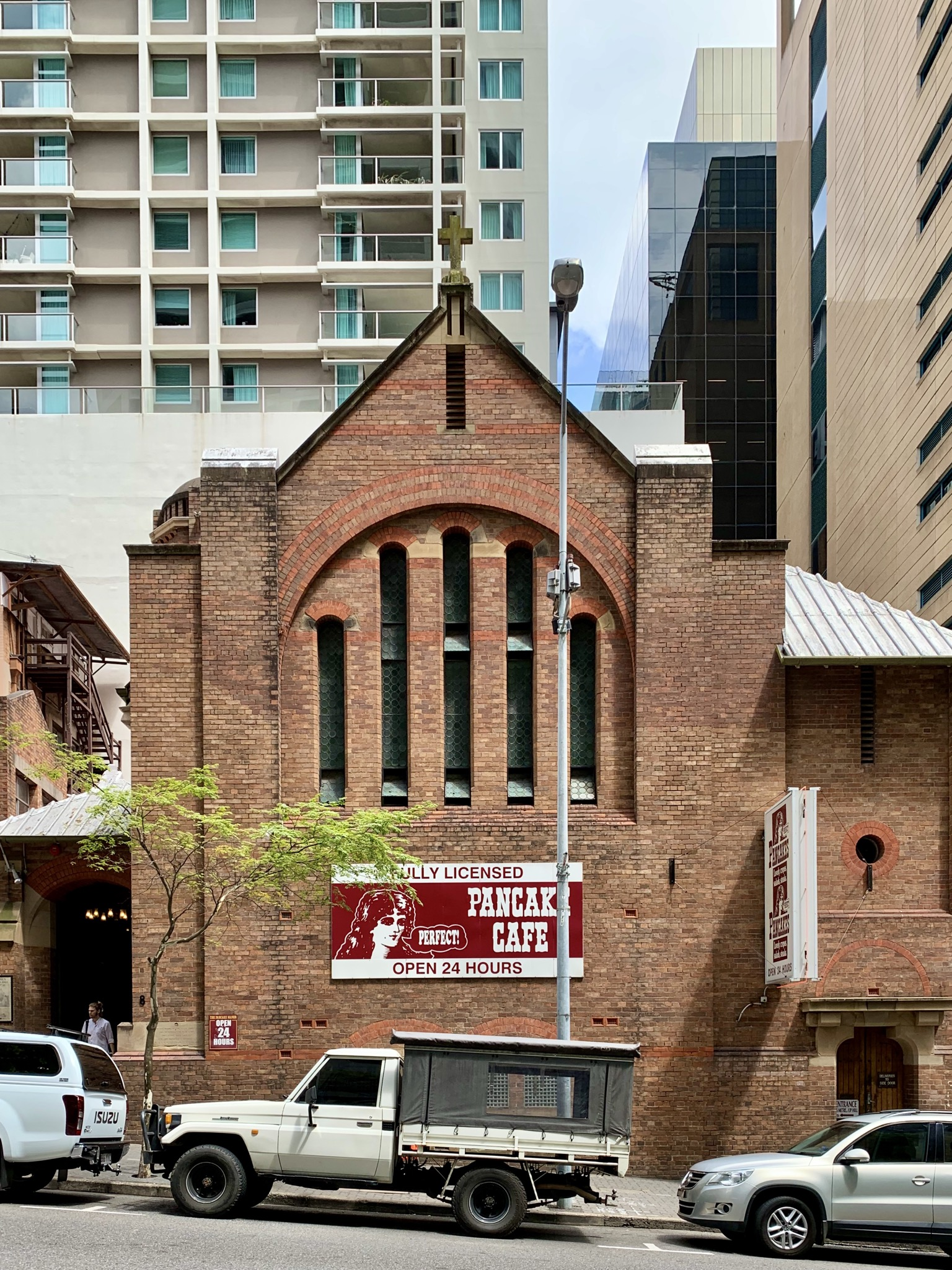
- Former St Luke's Church of England, 2020

- Location within Queensland
- 27.4721°S 153.0252°E
- Location: 18 Charlotte Street, Brisbane City, City of Brisbane, Queensland, Australia

History
- Design period: 1900–1914 (early 20th century)
- Built: 1904

Site notes
- Architect: John Smith Murdoch
- Architectural style: Romanesque

Queensland Heritage Register
- Official name: Pancake Manor, St Lukes Anglican Church
- Type: state heritage (built)
- Designated: 21 October 1992
- Reference no.: 600083
- Significant period: 1904 (fabric); 1904–1910, 1904–1950s, 1977, 1979 (historical)
- Significant components: tower, hall
- Builders: John Steward & Co

St Luke's Church of England, Brisbane is a heritage-listed former church and now restaurant at 18 Charlotte Street, Brisbane City, City of Brisbane, Queensland, Australia. It was designed by John Smith Murdoch and built in by John Steward & Co. It is also known as Pancake Manor. It was added to the Queensland Heritage Register on 21 October 1992.

== History ==
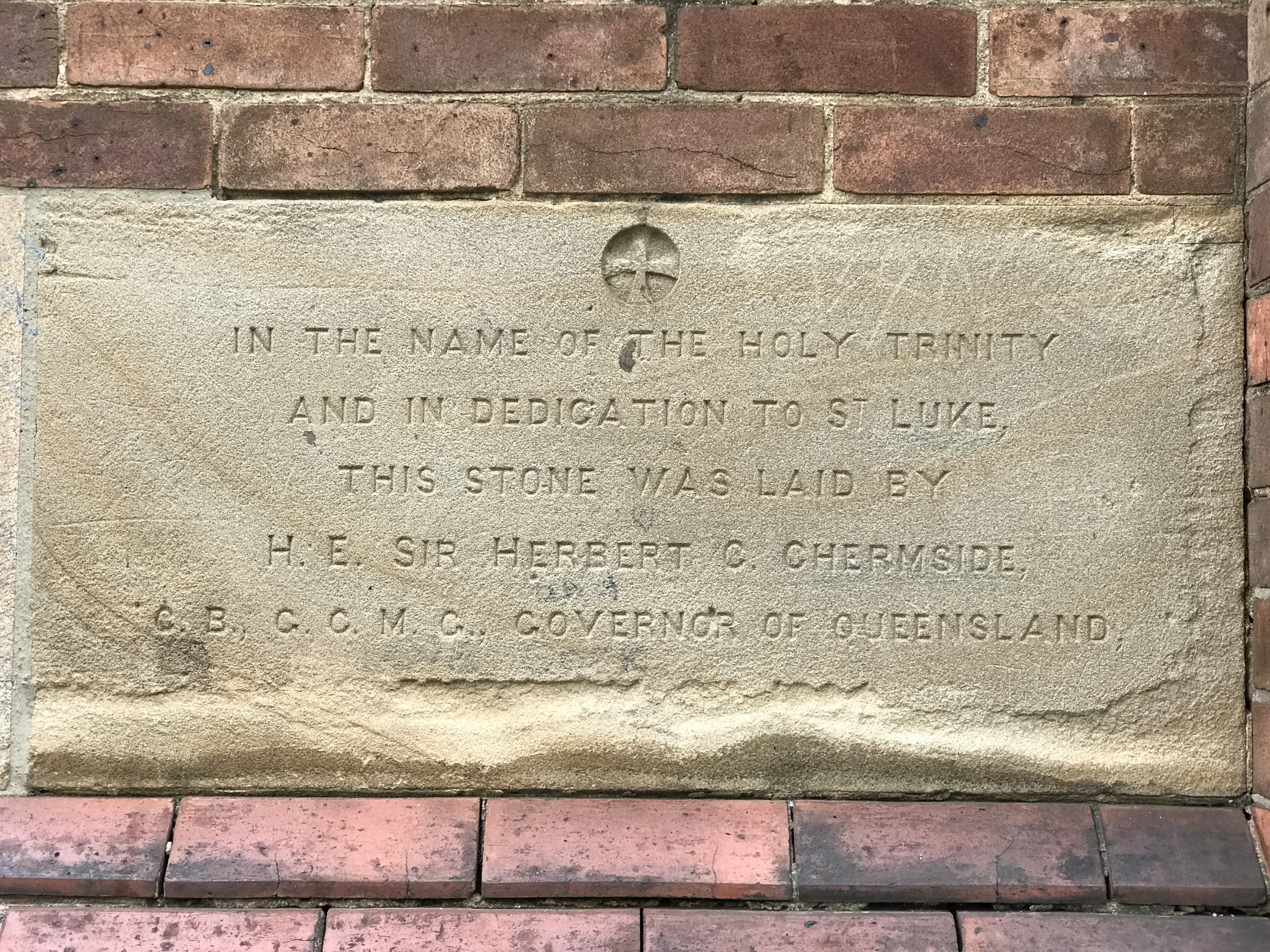
Foundation stone, 2017

The site was purchased in 1903 by the Church of England for a new mission church. Prior to this, the mission had rented rooms throughout Brisbane and St Luke's provided its first permanent home. On 3 February 1904 the foundation stone of St Luke's Church was laid by His Excellency, Sir Herbert Chermside, Governor of Queensland.

St Luke's served as a temporary cathedral between the demolition of St Johns Pro-Cathedral, 1904 and the opening of St Johns Cathedral in 1910. Architect, John Smith Murdoch, was commissioned to design a church which would utilise fully the limited site area. Murdoch, who was an architect for the Queensland Works Department (1894–1903); Chief Architect for Home Affairs (1919–1922) and Chief Architect of the Commonwealth (1926–30) took leave of absence to design St Luke's and Webber House.

St Luke's was purpose built for the Mission headquarters, providing meeting rooms in the basement. John Steward & Co constructed St Luke's which was dedicated on 14 August 1904 by the Administrator, the Venerable Arthur Evan David, Archdeacon of Brisbane. On St Thomas Day, 21 December 1904, St Clair George Alfred Donaldson was enthroned as Bishop of Brisbane in St Luke's. The ceremony was well attended by prominent clergy members and, as the church could only seat 402 people, entry was restricted to ticket holders only.

After 1910 St Luke's served its intended purpose as the headquarters of the Anglican Church Mission. The Mission was an evangelistic group which worked amongst the disadvantaged supplying food and shelter for the destitute and saving young girls from moral degradation. It also provided ministering to districts without parishes or churches. It ran several youth clubs, including the Newsboys Club, providing social companionship and spiritual guidance for the members. In 1908 the Overseas Girls Club was founded and later the hall was used as a meeting and recreational venue for the Girls Friendly Society.

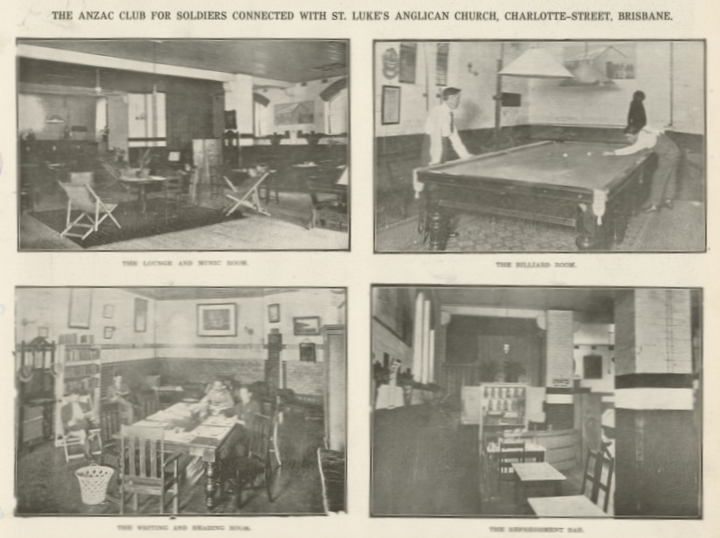
Facilities at the Anzac club included a lounge & music room, a billiard room, a reading & writing room and a refreshment room, 1917

During the First World War Canon David Garland, resident Chaplain of St Luke's, was Director of the Soldiers Church of England Help Society and the Mission corresponded with servicemen at the front. An Anzac Club was opened at St Luke's for returned soldiers and the hall was used for Sunday teas and dances. On 18 June 1917 a Nurses Honour Board was unveiled in St Luke's War Chapel in recognition of those who served in World War I.

During the Second World War St Luke's provided a meeting place and Saturday night dances for soldiers stationed in Brisbane.

St Luke's remained the Mission Headquarters until the 1950s and the meeting place of the Synod of the Diocese until 1977, after which St Luke's was no longer needed for church purposes.

In 1979 St Luke's Church was converted into a restaurant, the Pancake Manor.

== Description ==
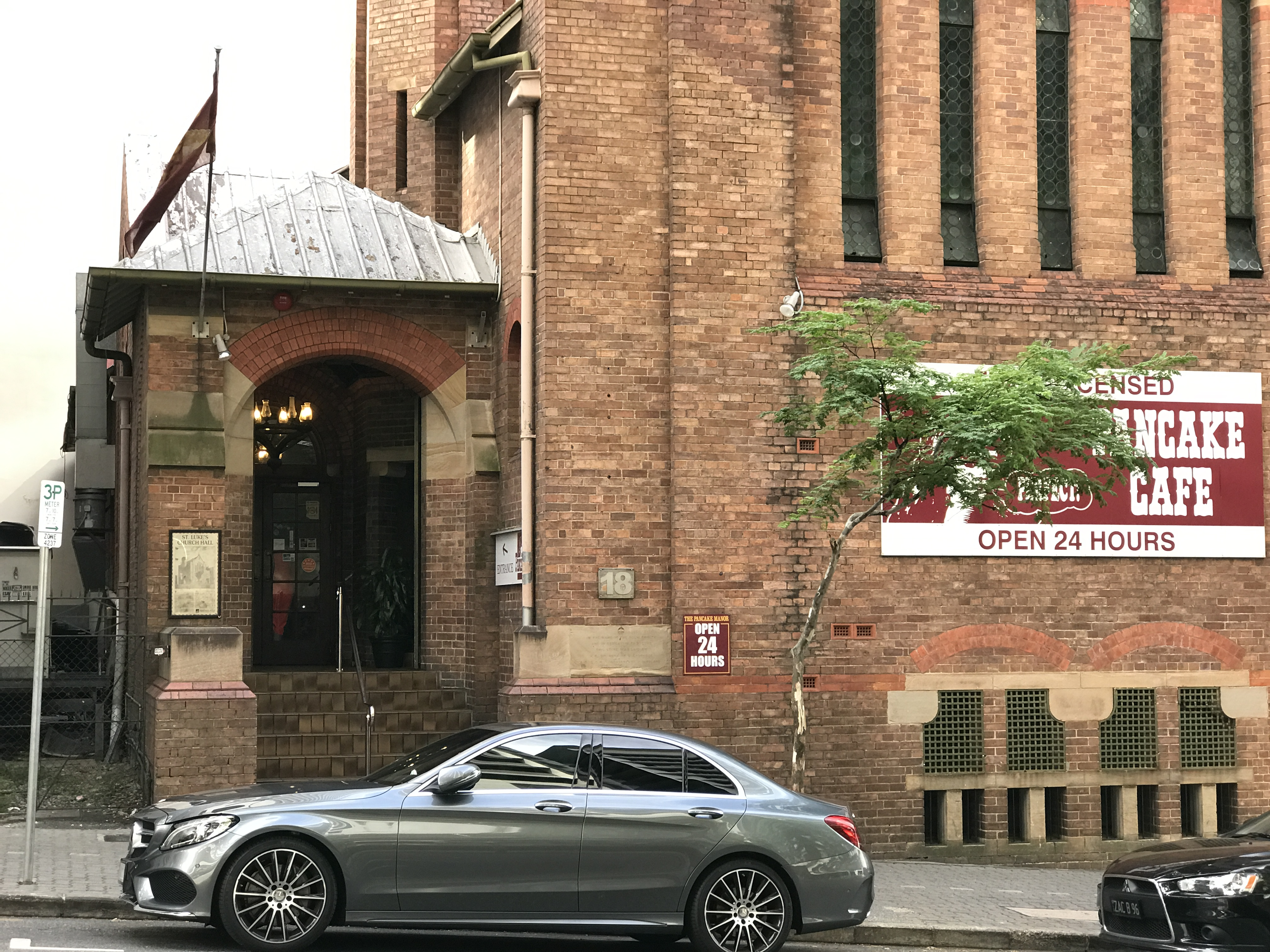
Building entrance, 2017

St Luke's is a finely detailed brick building in the Romanesque style whose predominant feature is the massive relieving archway containing vertical openings at the end of the chancel. It has a complicated roof form combining both hips and gables, along with a small octagonal tower near the entry. The roof sheeting is rolled iron. The plain brickwork is punctuated by bands of different coloured brick and the occasional use of stone around windows and doors. The building has the unusual arrangement of having entries to both floor levels at the chancel end in an attempt to optimise the building's orientation. The major entry to the upper church level is defined by a recessed porch.

The exterior and interior finishes of the building are particularly intact, despite the building's change of use, installation of kitchen facilities, and inappropriate interior door and external signage.

== Heritage listing ==
St Luke's was listed on the Queensland Heritage Register on 21 October 1992 having satisfied the following criteria.

The place is important in demonstrating the evolution or pattern of Queensland's history.

St Luke's was purpose built as a hall with meeting rooms to assist the Church of England Mission in its role of providing Christian charity to the community and ministering to districts without parishes or churches.

St Luke's has religious significance as the Anglican Pro-Cathedral, 1904–1910, as the Mission Headquarters, 1904–1950s, and as the meeting place of the Synod of the Diocese until 1977 and socially significant as a recreational venue for Anglican youth groups and World War I and World War 2 veterans.

The place is important in demonstrating the principal characteristics of a particular class of cultural places.

The quality of its polychrome brickwork and picturesque roof forms make the building visually appealing, and is a successful example of a building designed to fulfil the dual purpose of both Mission headquarters and Church.

The place is important because of its aesthetic significance.

The quality of its polychrome brickwork and picturesque roof forms make the building visually appealing, and is a successful example of a building designed to fulfil the dual purpose of both Mission headquarters and Church.

The scale and materials of this building form a visual complement to the other buildings in the precinct, notably the red facebrick facades of John Mills Himself and the John Reid and Nephews buildings.

The place is important in demonstrating a high degree of creative or technical achievement at a particular period.

The quality of its polychrome brickwork and picturesque roof forms make the building visually appealing, and is a successful example of a building designed to fulfil the dual purpose of both Mission headquarters and Church.

The place has a strong or special association with a particular community or cultural group for social, cultural or spiritual reasons.

St Luke's has religious significance as the Anglican Pro-Cathedral, 1904–1910, as the Mission Headquarters, 1904–1950s, and as the meeting place of the Synod of the Diocese until 1977 and socially significant as a recreational venue for Anglican youth groups and World War I and World War 2 veterans.

The place has a special association with the life or work of a particular person, group or organisation of importance in Queensland's history.

The church was designed by John S Murdoch who was commissioned by the Anglican Diocese of Brisbane to design St Luke's and Webber House in 1904.
