= All Saints Anglican Church, Brisbane =

All Saints Anglican Church
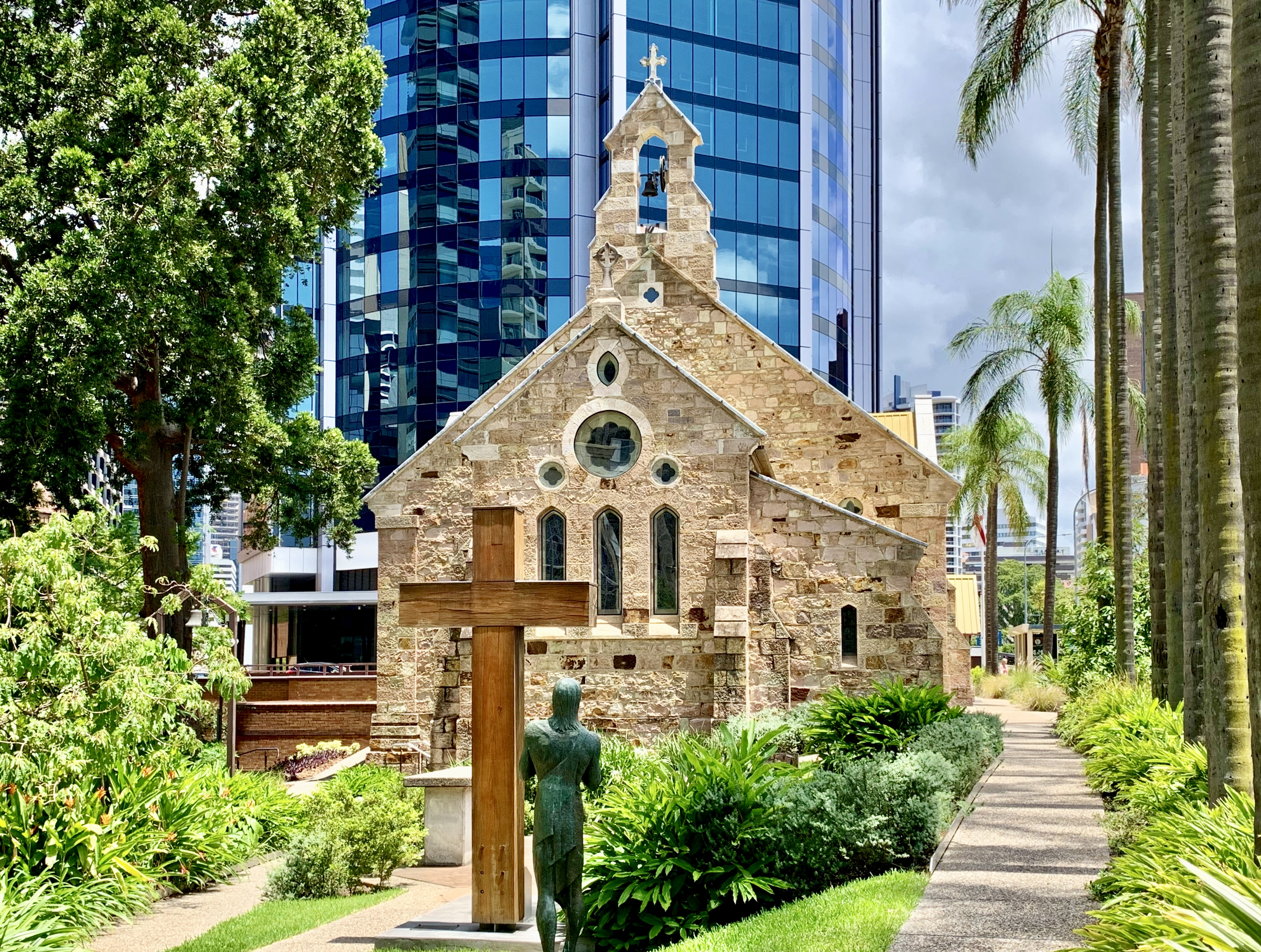
- All Saints Anglican Church
- 27.464486°S 153.028033°E
- Country: Australia
- Denomination: Anglican Church of Australia
- Churchmanship: Anglo-Catholic
- Website: allsaintsbrisbane.com

History
- Status: Parish church
- Founded: 8 September 1869
- Dedication: All Saints

Architecture
- Functional status: Active
- Style: Gothic Revival

Administration
- Province: Province of Queensland
- Diocese: Diocese of Brisbane

Clergy
- Priest: Duncan Gorwood

All Saints Anglican Church, Brisbane
- Location within Queensland
- 27.4646°S 153.0281°E
- Location: 32 Wickham Terrace, Spring Hill, City of Brisbane, Queensland, Australia

History
- Design period: 1840s–1860s (mid-19th century)
- Built: 1861–1869

Site notes
- Architect: Benjamin Joseph Backhouse
- Architectural style: Gothic

Queensland Heritage Register
- Official name: All Saints Anglican Church
- Type: state heritage (built)
- Designated: 21 October 1992
- Reference no.: 600168
- Significant period: 1861, 1869 (fabric)
- Significant components: furniture/fittings, trees/plantings, fence/wall – perimeter, plaque, stained glass window/s, gate – entrance

All Saints Anglican Church is a heritage-listed church at 32 Wickham Terrace, Spring Hill, City of Brisbane, Queensland, Australia. First founded in 1862, the current building designed by Benjamin Backhouse was completed in 1869, making it the oldest Anglican church in Brisbane. For most of its history, it has been identified with the High Church or Anglo-Catholic tradition within Anglicanism. It was added to the Queensland Heritage Register on 21 October 1992.

== History ==
This single-storeyed stone church, the oldest Anglican church in Brisbane, was erected in 1861 and rebuilt in 1869 for the Wickham Terrace District Anglican congregation. It is one of the few remaining parish churches in Queensland owned under the colonial provision of private trustees of church property.

The Church of England was the first church to be established in Queensland. In 1849 the site for St John's Church on William Street was granted, with the church being consecrated in 1854. The Wickham Terrace land was granted to the Anglican Church in 1856, although the first deed of grant was dated September 1865 and was originally intended as the site for an Anglican cathedral. The Diocese of Brisbane was formed in 1859 with Edward Tufnell as the first Bishop of Brisbane, taking office in 1860 and designating St John's as the pro-cathedral.

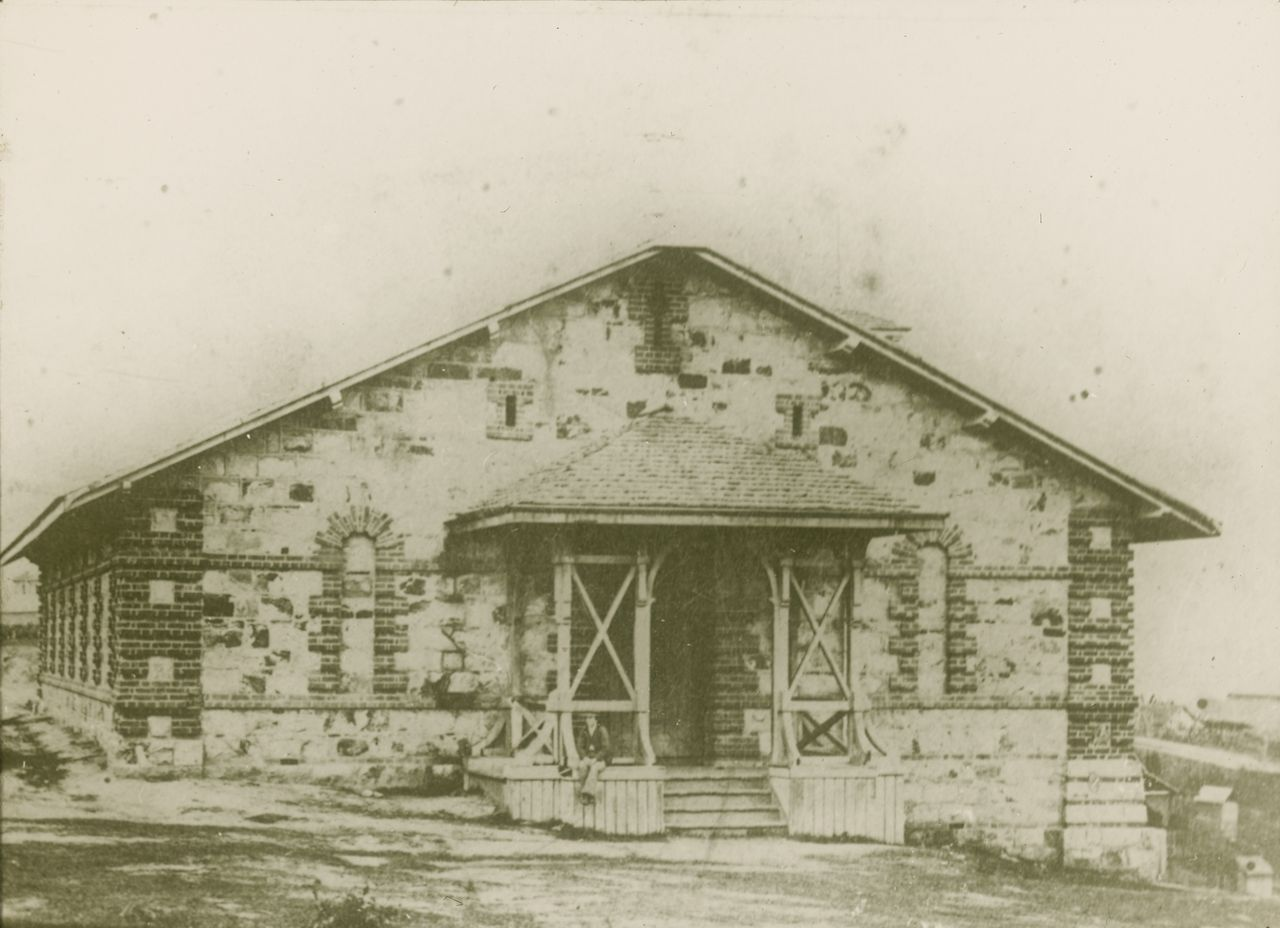
First All Saints' Church, 1862

The early 1860s growth of Windmill Hill and Spring Hill as residential areas prompted Bishop Tufnell in 1861 to promote the establishment of an Anglican church on the proposed cathedral site on Wickham Terrace. The original church, a rubble structure, was designed by noted architect Benjamin Backhouse in 1861 and opened on 23 February 1862 by Bishop Tufnell. It was known officially as the Wickham Terrace Episcopalian Church, or the Wickham Terrace District Church, and unofficially as the Tabernacle. Originally intended to be a second church in the same parish as St John's, in 1864 the congregation of the Wickham Terrace Church decided to become independent of St John's, with a parish carved out of St John's parish and extending as far as the present parish of Milton.

As the congregation grew in number, the initial Wickham Terrace church became too small and it was decided to extend the building and raise the roof by increasing the height of the existing walls. Architect Richard George Suter, churchwarden, Cambridge graduate and proponent of the Gothic style which dominated Anglican church architecture in Australia, designed the alterations which were carried out in 1869. The original rubble walls could not, however, support the additional weight of the increase and so the old walls were demolished, resulting in an almost entirely new building (the present church) being created. Only the original floor plan, flooring and roof were retained.

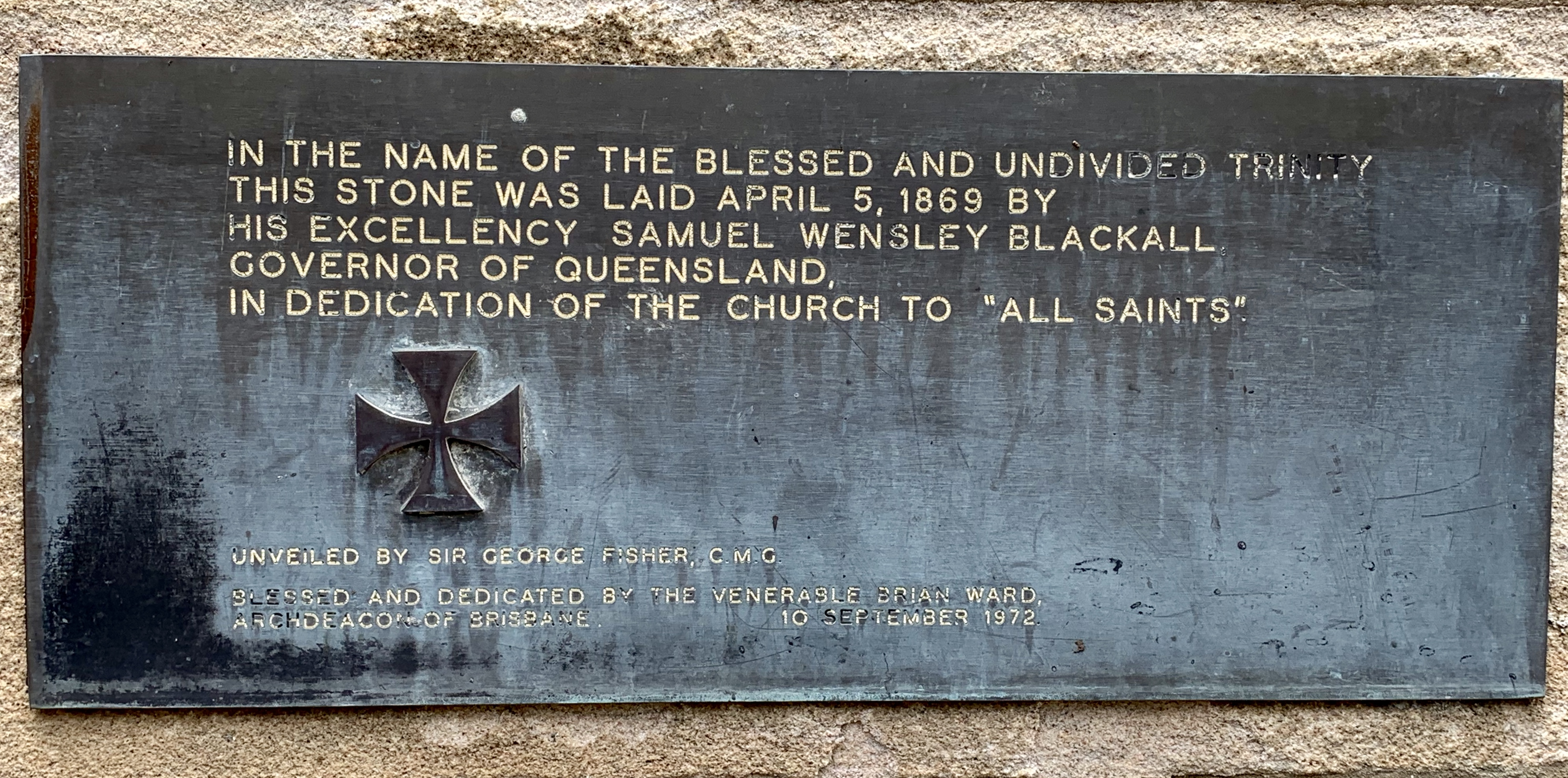
Plaque commemorating the dedication of the church by Governor Blackall in 1869

The dedication took place on 5 April 1869. The Governor of Queensland, Samuel Blackall, laid the foundation stone, a time capsule was deposited and Bishop Tufnell named the church "All Saints".

The church was increased in length by 20 feet (6.1 m), wall height was increased by 6 feet (1.8 m) and the roof by 8 feet (2.4 m). A chancel and vestry were added, and Brisbane tuff was used for the walls. Provision was made for a baptistery or large western porch to be added, but this was not carried out. The church was constructed by George Ely, stonemason of Spring Hill, and was completed at a cost of £1,864, excluding architect's fees.

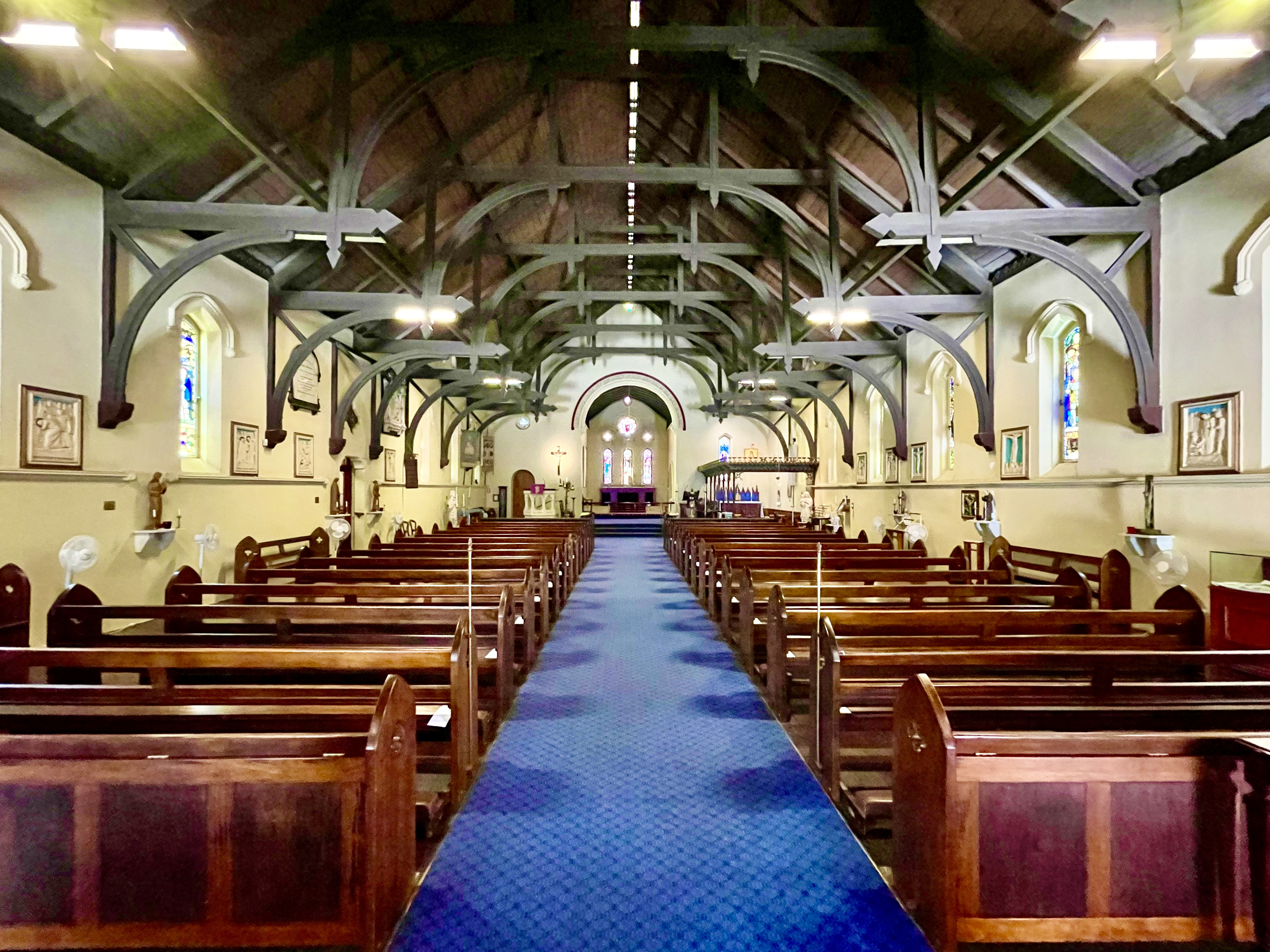
Interior of All Saints, 2019

The present church, the oldest existing Anglican church in Brisbane, was opened for worship on the Nativity of the Blessed Virgin Mary, 8 September 1869, by Bishop Tufnell, although some alterations were still taking place into the early 1870s.

In 1873, the parish was divided, with the parish of Milton being established. An adjacent rectory was built in 1880, and a hall/school building in 1884.

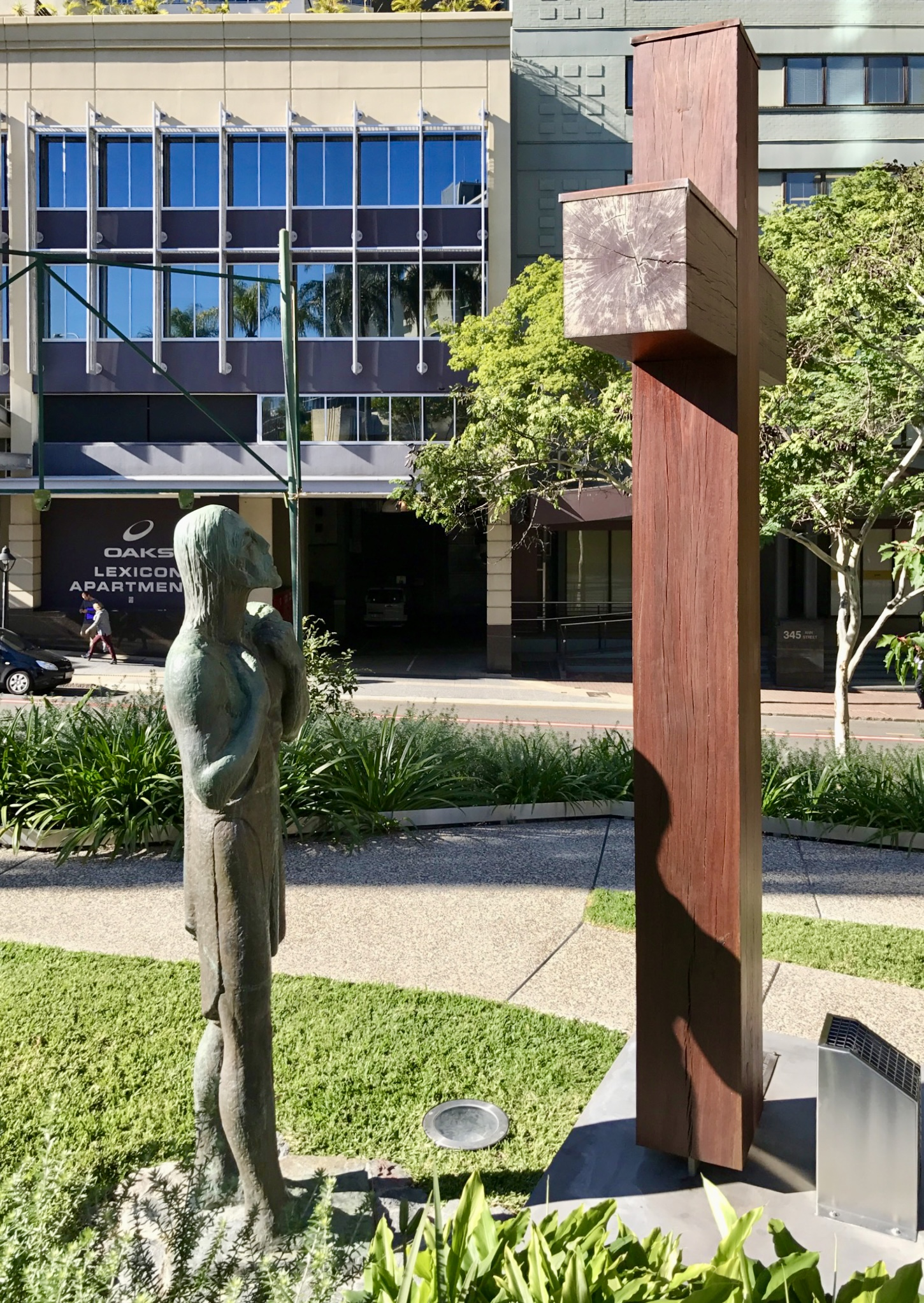
Christ Accepting His Cross by Andor Mészáros

The east end of the church contains the oldest stained glass windows in Brisbane, installed in 1870. The altar lights, presented in 1884, were the first in Brisbane. Artwork includes plaster Stations of the Cross sculpted by Brisbane artist Daphne Mayo in 1935, and a bronze and wood sculpture entitled Christ Accepting The Cross, by Andor Mészáros, erected in the forecourt to celebrate the centenary of All Saints in 1962.

The organ, made in London by TC Lewis and originally installed in St Johns Pro-Cathedral in the Queen's Gardens in 1873, was transferred to St Luke's Church of England in Charlotte Street, and later refurbished and moved to All Saints in 1957. The organ loft with circular cast-iron stair, are later additions and are located at the western end of the church. The original shingle roof has been replaced a number of times, currently with ribbed metal sheeting.

The church floor was replaced and walls repointed in 1933, and in 1934 the stone fence facing Wickham Terrace replaced a timber fence constructed in 1871.

In 1988, both hall and rectory were sold and demolished for the construction of an adjacent highrise tower. In 1993, a new church hall and office complex fronting Ann Street were constructed and a substantial section of the stone wall along Wickham Terrace was demolished.

== Description ==
This single-storeyed stone church sits on a raised triangular site at the junction of Ann Street and Wickham Terrace, Brisbane. Its style is nineteenth century Gothic Revival, with buttressed walls of rough faced rubble, porphyry and sandstone, and a metal clad roof. The interior has a fine example of a hammer-beam ceiling, which is rare in Australia.

The rectangular plan has a raised pulpit, projecting chancel and vestry. A transept is suggested by gables on the north and south elevations, and the building shows gothic influences in its design. The gabled roof is clad with ribbed metal sheeting and features double-ridge ventilation. The chancel has a similar roof, but at a lower height, with a small section of clerestory. The vestry has a skillion roof.

The western elevation has twin stone entrance porches, three lancet windows and a stone cross at the top of the gable. Dressed stone work is used around windows and to the top of the gable, and a Latin inscription reads DOMUS MEA DOMUS ORATIONIS (translated "my house shall be called a house of prayer"). The chancel gable has three lancets, two quatrefoils and a rose window surmounted by a vesica. The eastern nave gable is surmounted by a carved stone bellcote from which a bell is hung.

A timber entrance porch with a stone base and gabled roof is located on the northern elevation. There is also a plaque commemorating the dedication of the church. The southern elevation has brick banding to the corners of the stone plinth. The transept gables have two quatrefoils and a rose window with dressed stone surrounds.

Internally, walls are rendered and all windows feature stained glass. The nave has hammer-beam trusses with a boarded ceiling. The chancel has scissor braces with a boarded ceiling. An organ gallery has been installed at the western end of the nave. This is supported by metal posts and is accessed via a spiral cast-iron stair.

Fluorescent lights are fixed to the underside of the hammerbeams. A carved and painted timber screen surrounds the side chapel, and plaster mouldings feature around windows and above the arch to the chancel. The floors are of timber, with the sanctuary and chancel raised above the nave. Two stone arches, which have been infilled with stone blocks, appear on the western elevation and to the south side of the chancel.

The grounds include remnants of a row of palm trees, and stone fencing, masonry gate posts with a gothic-style gas lantern (now electrified) along the Wickham Street boundary, and a large jacaranda to the southwest of the nave.

The church contains the oldest stained glass in Queensland as well as other significant art works, such as the first public work of the Brisbane sculptor Daphne Mayo (the 14 Stations of the Cross).

== Worship ==
By the early 1900s, the services at All Saints were considered the most Anglo-Catholic in the diocese. In 1923 the use of incense in public worship was introduced, and three years later the pulpit crucifix was installed. In Brisbane, All Saints developed as the high Church of England parish.

In keeping with the Anglo-Catholic heritage of the parish, services are mainly eucharistic in nature. There is currently a Low Mass with hymns at 7:30 am and a Sung Mass at 9:30 am each Sunday. Said Masses are held on weekdays at 12:15 pm in the Lady Chapel in the south-eastern corner of the church. Choral Evensong (followed by Benediction of the Blessed Sacrament) is held on the first Sunday of each month.

All Saints maintains a professional choir which sings from the west end gallery. The church has an 1873 T. C. Lewis organ which was originally installed in St John's Pro-Cathedral in William Street. It was installed in All Saints in the 1950s. Between 2002 and 2007, it was substantially rebuilt and enlarged by Brisbane organ builder W. J. Simon Pierce.

== Notable members of the congregation ==
All Saints' Church has played a significant part in the story of Brisbane's development into a city of culture and significance. To this day, All Saints' is regarded by many as the "Parish Church of the City of Brisbane". Well-known identities who worshipped at All Saints' in the nineteenth century included:

- Sir James Dickson, Premier of Queensland and Minister of Defence in the first Commonwealth Government
- The Hon. John Douglas, Premier of Queensland
- Sir Robert Ramsey Mackenzie, Premier of Queensland
- Mary Peattie

== Heritage listing ==
All Saints Anglican Church was listed on the Queensland Heritage Register on 21 October 1992 having satisfied the following criteria.

The place is important in demonstrating the evolution or pattern of Queensland's history.

All Saints Anglican Church is important in demonstrating the pattern of Queensland's history, in particular the development of the Anglican Church in Brisbane.

The place demonstrates rare, uncommon or endangered aspects of Queensland's cultural heritage.

The Church demonstrates rare aspects of Queensland's cultural heritage, in particular, as one of the oldest surviving Anglican churches in Brisbane containing the oldest stained glass and containing the organ from St John's Pro-Cathedral.

The place is important in demonstrating the principal characteristics of a particular class of cultural places.

The building is important in demonstrating the principal characteristics of a Gothic influenced, 1860s stone church in Brisbane.

The place is important because of its aesthetic significance.

All Saints Anglican Church is important in exhibiting a range of aesthetic characteristics valued by the Brisbane community, in particular, the siting of the church and surviving early grounds, and their contribution through scale, form, materials and planting to the Wickham Terrace and Ann Street streetscapes and Brisbane townscape. Also highly valued is the quality of the stonework and interior, including stained glass, timber joinery, early furnishings, sculptures and artwork.

The place has a strong or special association with a particular community or cultural group for social, cultural or spiritual reasons.

All Saints Anglican Church has a strong and special association with the Brisbane Anglican community as one of the oldest surviving Anglican churches in Brisbane, and with the Anglo-Catholic movement in Queensland.

The place has a special association with the life or work of a particular person, group or organisation of importance in Queensland's history.

The building has a special association with the work of noted architect RG Suter and noted Brisbane artist/sculptor Daphne Mayo.
