= Webber House, Brisbane =

Heritage-listed building in Brisbane, Queensland

Webber House
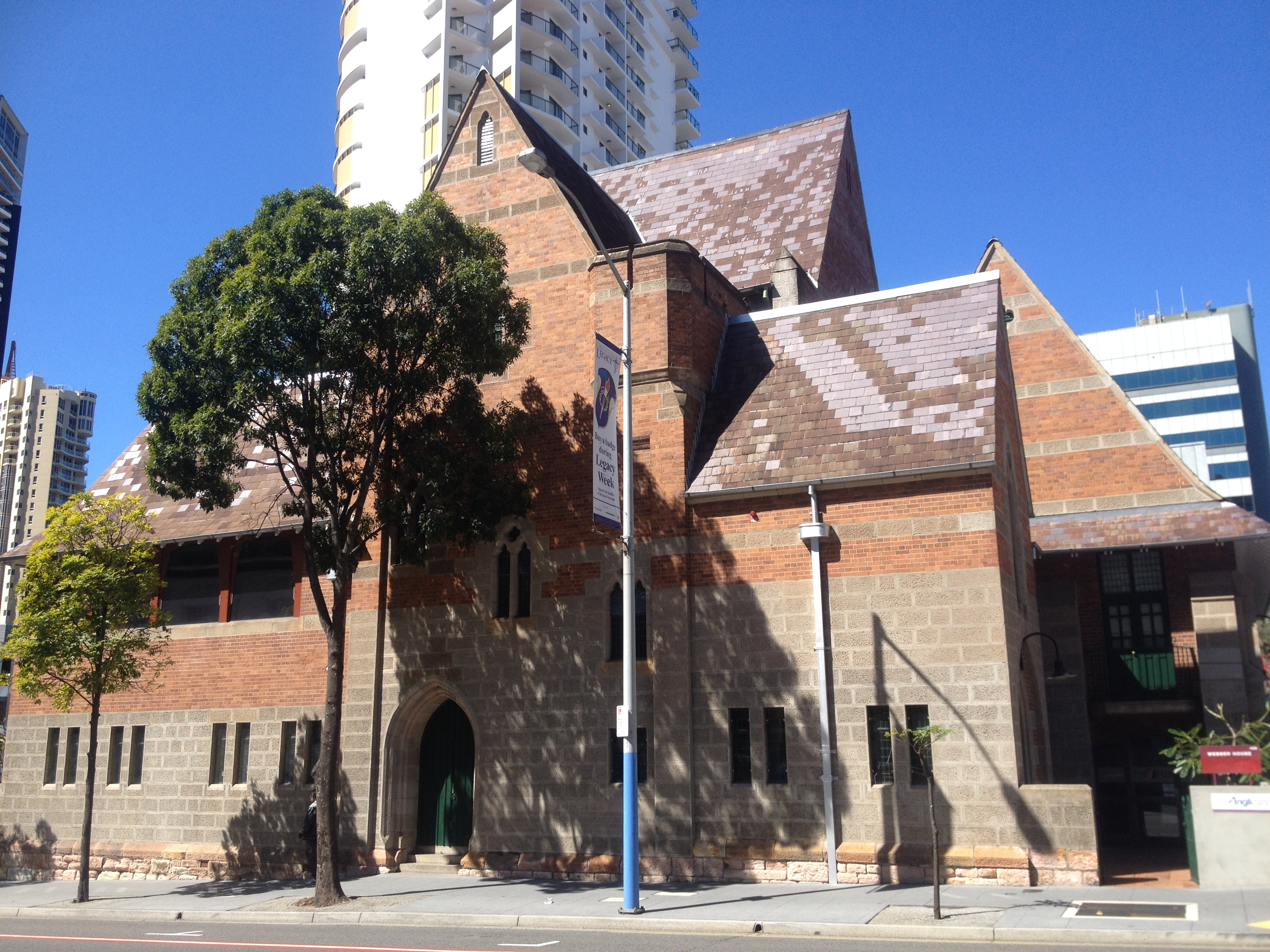
- Webber House

- Location within Queensland Location within Australia
- 27.4632°S 153.0305°E
- Location: 439 Ann Street, Brisbane City, City of Brisbane, Queensland, Australia

History
- Design period: 1900–1914 (early 20th century)
- Built: 1904

Site notes
- Architect(s): John Smith Murdoch, Robin Dods
- Architectural style: Arts & Crafts

Queensland Heritage Register
- Official name: Webber House, Cathedral Schools and St John's Institute
- Type: state heritage (built)
- Designated: 21 October 1992
- Reference no.: 600079
- Significant period: 1904 (fabric); 1936–1941, 1941–1945 (historical)
- Significant components: hall – assembly
- Builders: Worley & Whitehead

Webber House is a heritage-listed former school and present-day church hall at 439 Ann Street, Brisbane City, City of Brisbane, Queensland, Australia. It sits within the grounds of St John's Cathedral, Brisbane. It was designed by John Smith Murdoch and Robin Dods and built in 1904 by Worley & Whitehead. It is also known as Cathedral Schools and St John's Institute. It was added to the Queensland Heritage Register on 21 October 1992.

== History ==
In 1899 the Anglican Diocese of Brisbane acquired property in Ann Street for the construction of St John's Cathedral, a day school and Church Institute. It was constructed by Worley and Whitehead of Ipswich to a joint design of John S. Murdoch and the diocesan architect Robin S. Dods. Murdoch, who was an architect for the State Works Department (1894–1903) took leave of absence to design Webber House and also St Luke's Church of England in Charlotte Street.

Stone from St John's Pro-Cathedral in William Street (demolished in 1904) was re-used for the foundation stones, and in the front and rear walls. The main doors, most of the gothic style windows and the roof trusses were also re-used.

The ground floor contained the assembly hall and at the rear were two covered playsheds. The second floor included the institute reading room, two schoolrooms and the teachers' room. The top storey was one large room for the institute. In all, accommodation was provided for 300 children.

The Sisters of the Sacred Advent conducted a school in the premises from 1936 until 1941. During the Second World War the building was occupied by the Australian Army Engineering Corps and the Army Medical Department and was subsequently used for cathedral activities and meeting hall.

In 1969–70 the building was renovated and the verandahs were enclosed. It was named Webber House in honour of William Webber, third Bishop of Brisbane (1885–1903). Webber had been instrumental in initiating the development of the cathedral precinct.

== Description ==
Built in 1904, as part of the St John's Cathedral complex, Webber House is a three-storeyed masonry building with steeply pitched slate roofs. While the roof form and windows give it a Gothic appearance, the details, mixture of materials, scale of elements, external spaces are influenced by the contemporary Arts and Crafts movement.

The massing of the building consists of steep gable roofs gradually stepping up at right angles to each other until they reach the tall three storeyed central gable portion. The stonework appears generally in the lower part of the structure up to the top of the first level and then appears in strips and around the window openings in the brickwork above. The fenestration is predominantly Gothic arched but some square headed openings and small quatrefoil vents appear high up in some of the gable ends. Two of the gable roofs have lower portions of a lesser pitch, creating a form of sun hood. Immediately below the eaves line of this feature of the roof is a band of glazing separated in one case by the tops of buttresses when they occur, and in the other by timber posts.

Internally, a spacious stairwell leads to the upper floors. The top floor features a steep boarded ceiling above timber trusses which are supported at each end on three turned timber columns.

Fretting stonework to the ground floor has been cement-rendered to imitate the original pick-faced and margined stones. The building is generally intact both externally and internally.

== Heritage listing ==
Webber House was listed on the Queensland Heritage Register on 21 October 1992 having satisfied the following criteria:

The place is important in demonstrating the principal characteristics of a particular class of cultural places.

Webber House is significant as an excellent example of a creative architectural design in the Arts and Crafts manner re-using materials from the Pro-Cathedral. The building forms an integral part of the cathedral complex.

The place is important because of its aesthetic significance.

Webber House is significant as an excellent example of a creative architectural design in the Arts and Crafts manner re-using materials from the Pro-Cathedral. The building forms an integral part of the cathedral complex.

The place has a special association with the life or work of a particular person, group or organisation of importance in Queensland's history.

Webber House is significant as an example of the work of two prominent Queensland architects, John Murdoch and Robin Dods. The building is also significant for its association with Bishop Webber who was instrumental in the development of the cathedral complex.
