= The Deanery, Brisbane =

Heritage-listed building in Brisbane, Queensland

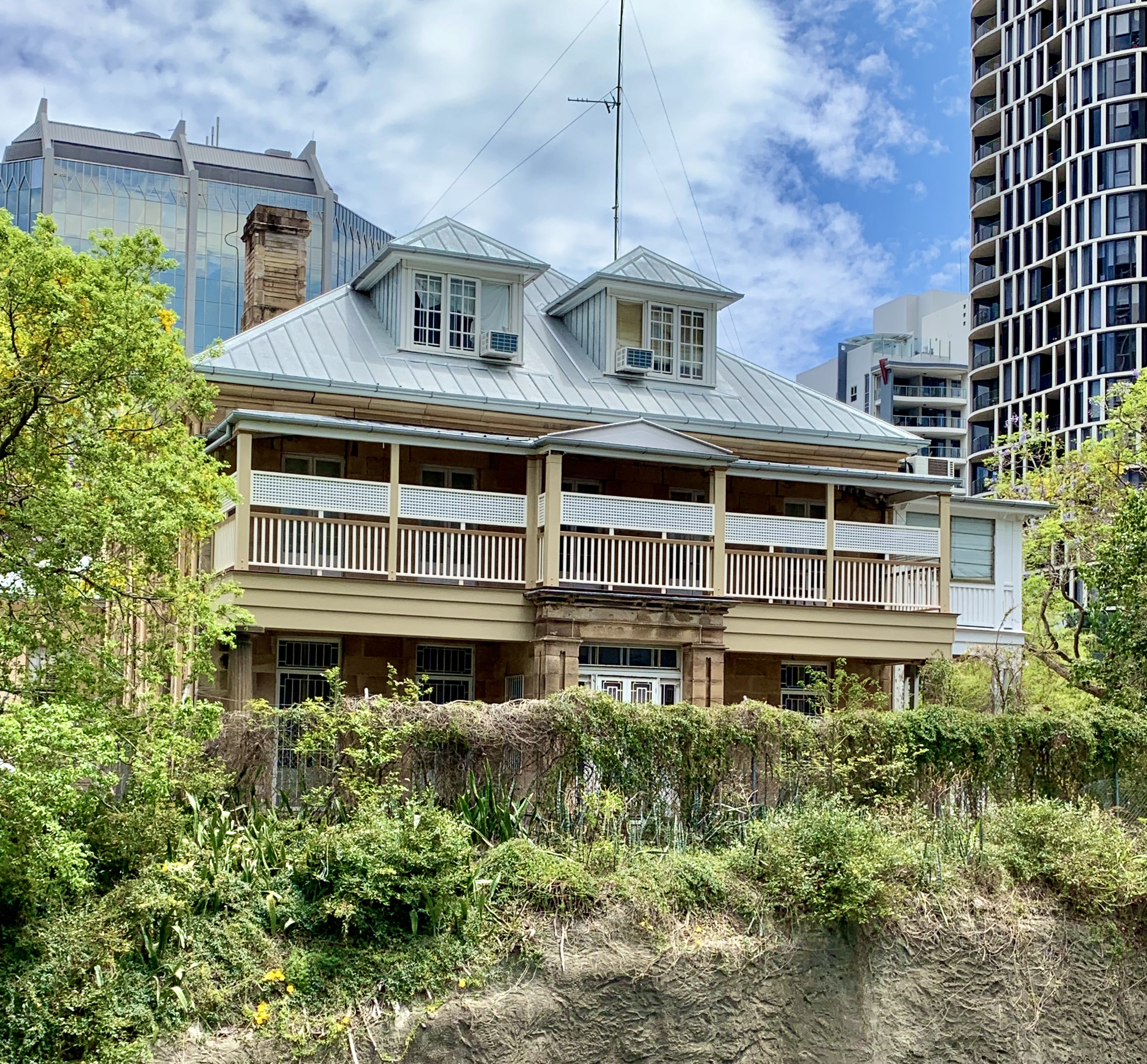
- The Deanery, 2019

- Location within Queensland Location within Australia
- 27.4638°S 153.0306°E
- Location: 417 Ann Street, Brisbane City, City of Brisbane, Queensland, Australia

History
- Design period: 1840s–1860s (mid-19th century)
- Built: c. 1853–c. 1909
- Built for: William Hobbs

Site notes
- Architect: Robin Dods (renovations)

Queensland Heritage Register
- Official name: The Deanery, Adelaide House
- Type: state heritage (built)
- Designated: 21 October 1992
- Reference no.: 600078
- Significant period: 1850s (historical)
- Significant components: residential accommodation – main house, attic
- Builders: Andrew Petrie

The Deanery is a heritage-listed detached house at 417 Ann Street, Brisbane City, City of Brisbane, Queensland, Australia. It sits within the grounds of St John's Cathedral, Brisbane. It was built c. 1853 by Andrew Petrie and renovated in c. 1909 to a design by Robin Dods. It is also known as Adelaide House. It was added to the Queensland Heritage Register on 21 October 1992.

== History ==
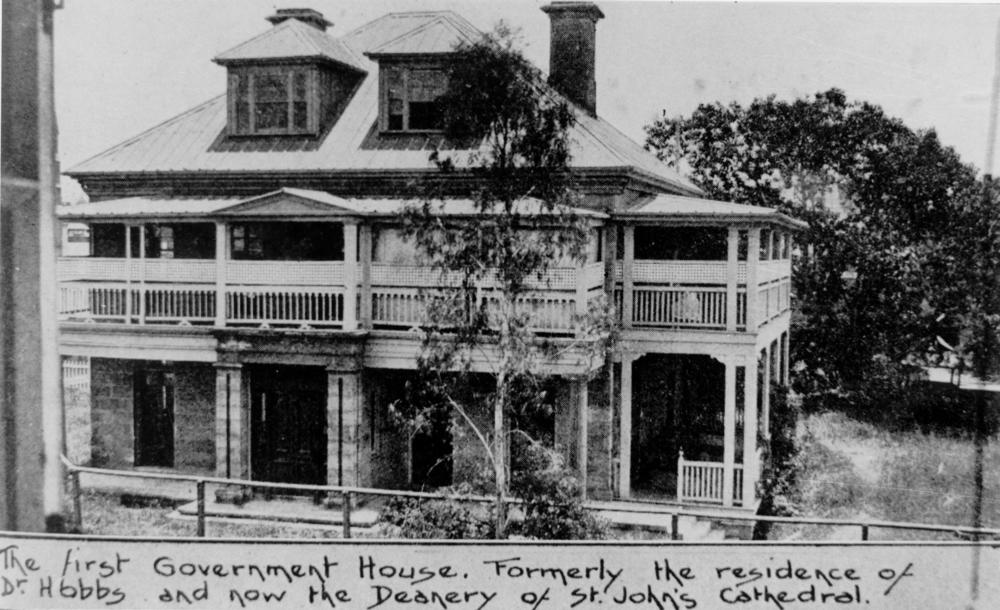
Deanery at St. John's Cathedral, Brisbane, 1921

This residence, originally known as Adelaide House, was constructed for Dr William Hobbs who arrived in Brisbane in May 1849 as the ship's surgeon on board the Chaseley, the second of Reverend John Dunmore Lang's immigrant ships. Hobbs was a prominent medical figure. In 1853 Hobbs commissioned Andrew Petrie to build a two-storey house on a hill overlooking the river.

When Sir George Bowen was appointed the first Governor of Queensland in 1859, Government House was still being planned. As an interim measure, Adelaide House was rented by the government for £350 per year, as the Governor's residence. On 10 December 1859, the proclamation creating the colony of Queensland was read by civil servant Abram Orpen Moriarty on the first floor balcony of Adelaide House where he was sworn in as Governor by Judge Alfred Lutwyche. On the completion of Government House in lower George Street in 1862, Dr Hobbs returned with his family to Adelaide House.

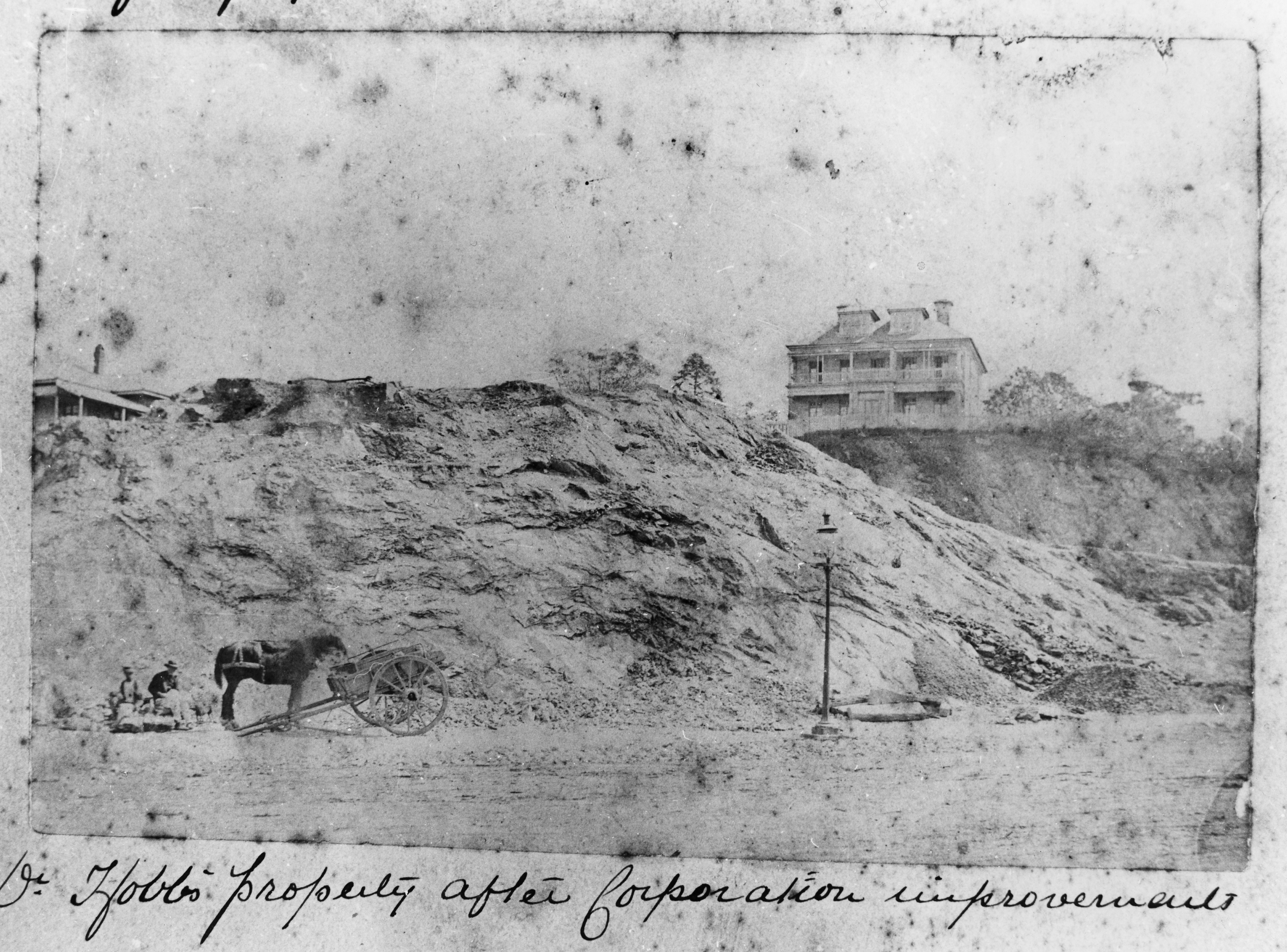
Adelaide House, after the excavations of Adelaide Street removed its frontage, circa 1882

In the 1880s excavations for the extension of Adelaide Street destroyed Dr Hobbs's garden and left the house close to the steep cutting, prompting the family to move in 1883. From 1883 until 1899 the property was let to various tenants and for a period was used as a day school and later a boarding house.

In 1899, the property was acquired by the Church of England and was used as a Church Institute, a book depot and Diocesan Registry. With the construction of Church House in 1909, Adelaide House was renovated and the verandahs, to a design of Robin Dods, were added. After the consecration of St John's Cathedral in 1910, Adelaide House became the residence for the Dean and known as The Deanery.

Alterations and renovations costing £4,000 were undertaken in 1954. Also a double garage was built, replacing the coach house and stables. The Dean moved into the northern section of the building and the Precentor occupied the southern half. Recently, the Precentor moved to nearby St Martin's House.

== Description ==
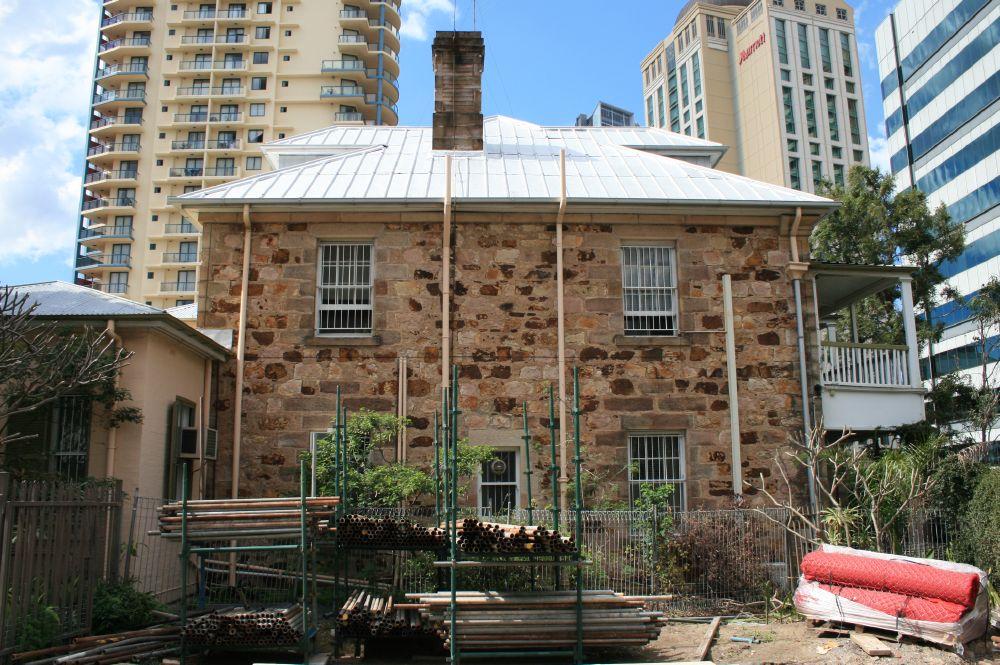
View from south-west, 2008

This two storey residence with attic has external walls of 600-millimetre (24 in) thick random Brisbane tuff with sandstone facings. It has a symmetrical plan form with a nearly pyramidal hipped roof with hipped attic dormer windows. Two of these look out towards the Brisbane River and another pair face Ann Street to the rear of the building. Chimneys rise from the end hips of the main roof.

The two-level timber verandahs have shallow hipped roofs at the upper level with the one facing Adelaide Street having a gable section in line with the entry at the ground floor level. French doors open to the verandahs which have timber posts and detailing. The side verandah has paired posts compared to the verandah over the entry which has individual ones. The original entry, which now faces the sheer drop to Adelaide Street has a freestone pilastered entrance porch, flanked by two Doric columns at the front. The entry door is surrounded by leadlight windows.

The house has a high degree of integrity internally, despite alterations to room layouts at various stages which involved both the removal and additions of walls and doors. Some original fireplaces remain, as does most joinery including the staircase, which is painted white. The side verandahs have been enclosed.

== Heritage listing ==
The Deanery was listed on the Queensland Heritage Register on 21 October 1992 having satisfied the following criteria.

The place is important in demonstrating the evolution or pattern of Queensland's history.

The Deanery is significant as Queensland's first Government House and the site where Queensland was proclaimed a colony.

The place demonstrates rare, uncommon or endangered aspects of Queensland's cultural heritage.

The building is also a rare example of an 1850s residence.

The place is important in demonstrating the principal characteristics of a particular class of cultural places.

The Deanery is significant as an example of the work of Andrew Petrie who constructed many of Brisbane's early buildings.

The place has a special association with the life or work of a particular person, group or organisation of importance in Queensland's history.

The Deanery is significant for its association with Dr Hobbs, a prominent medical figure in nineteenth century Queensland.
