= All Hallows' School Buildings =

Heritage-listed buildings in Brisbane, Queensland

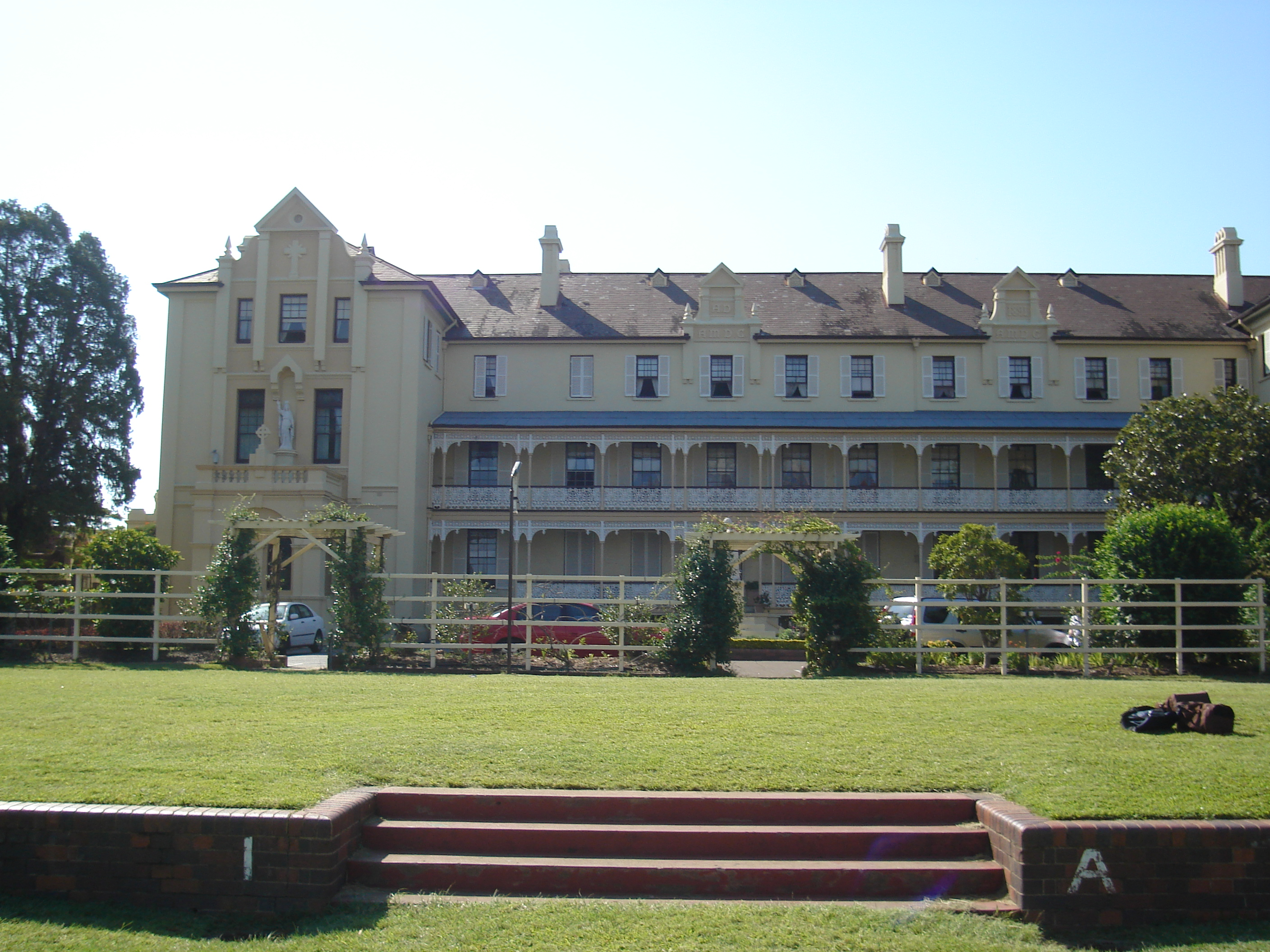
- Adderton Building, 2007

- Location within Queensland
- 27.461°S 153.0337°E
- Location: 547 Ann Street, Fortitude Valley, City of Brisbane, Queensland, Australia

Queensland Heritage Register
- Official name: All Hallows Convent and School, Adderton (Convent)
- Type: state heritage (landscape, built)
- Designated: 21 October 1992
- Reference no.: 600200
- Significant period: 1850s+ (soc); 1850s–1900s (hist); 1850s–1960s (fab-convent); 1880s–1940s (fab-main bldg); 1870s–1880
- Significant components: lawn/s, gate – entrance, stained glass window/s, laundry / wash house, studio – artist's / craftsman's, aviary, garden/grounds, school/school room, classroom/classroom block/teaching area, sports field/oval/playing field, formation – tramway, terracing, gatehouse, wall/s – retaining, trees/plantings, sculpture, grotto, convent/nunnery

All Hallows' School Buildings are a heritage-listed group of Roman Catholic private school buildings at 547 Ann Street, Fortitude Valley, City of Brisbane, Queensland, Australia. They were designed by a number of notable Brisbane architects and were constructed over many years. The earliest is the All Hallows Convent, also known as Adderton. The buildings were added to the Queensland Heritage Register on 21 October 1992.

== History ==
All Hallows' Convent and School was established in 1863 on Petrie Bight, as the first permanent site of the convent and school of the Sisters of Mercy in Queensland. The site comprises many important buildings reflecting the growth of the school. The arrangement of the site and the buildings thereon reflect the acquisition of land and the introspective nature of the planning of the school.

Following the separation of Queensland from New South Wales in 1859, a new Roman Catholic diocese which separated the newly formed Diocese of Queensland from the Diocese of Newcastle. On 14 April 1859 James Quinn, who was residing in Ireland at the time, was appointed the first Bishop of Queensland and arrived in Brisbane on 12 March 1861. Between his appointment and his arrival, Quinn recruited desperately needed clergy and religious Sisters. He arrived in Brisbane with several priests and five Sisters of Mercy, under the guidance of the Mother Superior, Mother Mary Vincent Whitty.

The Sisters of Mercy were principally a teaching order, founded in Ireland by Catherine McAuley in 1831. The establishment of religious schools in the new colony was seen as a crucial need to instil and strengthen faith in the struggling community described as one in which religion was very secondary and money-making was the object and aim of existence. The day after Mother Vincent's arrival a deputation from Ipswich requested that the Sisters settle in their town, but accommodation was soon found for the sisters in Brisbane, where the need for them must have been greater felt.

=== Adderton and the Convent ===
In December 1863 Bishop Quinn purchased on behalf of the Sisters of Mercy the former home of Dr George Fullerton who had been appointed to the first Legislative Council of Queensland but soon after left for Maranoa. The house, presumably built for Fullerton was known as Adderton and was sold to Quinn for £6000. The house was located on Petrie Bight, across Ann Street from the Bishop's own rented residence, Dara, and these two properties were considered two of the largest and best appointed homes in Brisbane at the time. On their arrival the Sisters had been provided with only temporary accommodation near St Stephen's church. Adderton was to be used as a convent for the Sisters of Mercy, and as accommodation for a boarding school. Among the chief concerns of the Bishop was the establishment of a Catholic education system, and this was his primary motivation for introducing to Queensland the order of sisters renowned for their teaching.

It is thought that the newly formed school was named All Hallows' by Mother Vincent after All Hallows' College, Dublin which was in turn named to recall the seventh century parish church, All Hallows'-by- the-Tower in London. All Hallows', Brisbane was to operate in conjunction with the school at St Stephen's which had been established and operated by lay members of the community since 1845, but for which the Sisters assumed the management of upon their arrival in 1861. All Hallows' was established as a "select" school, where money raised from fees could be used to finance the parish or "poor" schools, of which the school at St Stephen's was an early example.

Adderton is presumed to have been built in the late 1850s for Dr Fullerton after he purchased the property above Petrie Bight, which with its far reaching views of Brisbane, from Thomas Adams in 1858. Adams, with Henry Watson, acquired the original Deeds of Grant of the land in two separate deeds in July 1844 and May 1852. After its construction Adderton was located on 2 acres (0.81 ha) on what was known as Duncan's Hill but the site is now perceived, after the cutting down of Ann Street, as a cliff face to Ann Street sloping south eastward to the Brisbane River.

Adderton forms the central section of the present day convent, and was originally a two storeyed house with basement which was designed and constructed by early Brisbane builder, Andrew Petrie. Petrie was principally a building contractor, but was able to provide designs for local buildings until the influx of architects to Brisbane in the 1860s. Petrie was also responsible for the design and construction of the 1853 Adelaide House, later known as The Deanery, for Dr William Hobbs.

An early photograph of Adderton reveals it as a simple stone building of Georgian proportion and detail; a centrally located doorway with an elliptical fanlight above, flanked by timber shuttered windows and with chimney stacks protruding from each end of a simple gabled roof. Many of the features of the early house including a geometric stair, entrance door and light, windows and shutters, fireplaces along with the general planning of the interior are extant within what has become a much larger convent.

On 1 November 1863 the Sisters and some boarders from St Stephen's school transferred to Adderton. Classrooms were established in the reception and dining rooms on the ground floor, the study to the rear of these was used as a chapel and the floor above became sleeping quarters. Thus began the school and convent of All Hallows' which continues today as the head convent of the Sisters of Mercy in Queensland and from where the Sisters rapidly expanded their network of educational and social welfare institutions.

The education offered by the Sisters for the young women of Queensland was of a high standard, and sought after by members of all religious denominations from regional centres all over Queensland and northern New South Wales. Indeed, the number of non-catholic enrolments exceeded that of the catholic enrolments for many years until the 1880s, and remained equal to them until the turn of the century. This ecumenical spirit persisted despite the establishment of the Brisbane Girls Grammar School in 1875. 1879 saw All Hallows' produce its first candidate for the Sydney University Junior Public Examinations, being the first female candidate from a convent school in Australia. The Sisters were able to provide a comprehensive education including music, domestic science as well as more academic pursuits where specialist teachers of this sort were not introduced into state schools until the 1940s.

Adderton remained unaltered as the head convent for the Sisters of Mercy in Queensland until 1890, when major alterations were planned which saw the former two storeyed house engulfed in a much larger complex involving another storey, an extension of fifty feet in the length of the house and the addition of transverse wings. These alterations were planned by local architects Hunter and Corrie and executed in 1892, by contractors Messrs Woollam and Norman for upwards of £13,000. A descriptive report of the nearly completed building was carried in the national architectural periodical, The Building and Engineering Journal of 27 February 1892.

The basement of the new convent contained accommodation for "House of Refuge" girls, work rooms, bathrooms and storage areas. The ground floor housed various reception room and offices, a nuns' sacristy and halls for the building's three main staircases, along with the sisters' dining room and a chapel in the south-western wing. The chapel featured an apsidal chancel, floored with encaustic tiles and accessed via wide marble stairs; fine pine joinery and panelling stained to a light cedar colour; and a memorial stained glass window from Munich. Seating accommodation in the chapel was divided such that the Sisters sat on the ground floor and the boarders at the convent were seated in a gallery above the entrance of the chapel. verandahs were added to the front and rear of the ground and first floors of the central section of the building at this time. The cement rendered brick extensions were erected on concrete foundations, and with a slate roof.

With this 1892 extension a walkway was constructed which connected the convent to the school building erected in 1884. Incorporated as part of the walkway was a bell tower in which was placed an Angelus bell brought with the Sisters from Ireland in 1861 and dedicated to Saint Charles Borromeo, which to this day chimes daily at noon.

Along with education the Sisters of Mercy at All Hallows' provided many other social programmes, including the care and concern for the welfare of those considered less fortunate. Bishop Quinn approved the establishment of a House of Mercy (occasionally also referred to as the previously mentioned House of Refuge) at All Hallows' on February 11, 1875 with the aim of the protection of poor women of good character, and in fact, providing accommodation for women including unwed mothers, inebriates and former gaolees in return for domestic work of various types. Later, parents or the police were able to send young girls to the House as a preventative measure against further trouble. A separate building was constructed as the House of Mercy at All Hallows' in 1878 between the rear of the convent and the Ann Street boundary. This building had a U-shaped plan, forming an enclosed courtyard with the convent. A large laundry was built in the vicinity in 1897, and this was one of the principal workshops of the inhabitants of the House of Mercy.

The north-eastern wing of the convent was extended toward Ann Street in 1913 to house further dining, library and bedroom facilities. In 1921 the chapel, in the other wing, was almost tripled in size, removing the apsidal chancel and extending the whole wing toward the Ann Street perimeter of the school, and adding a transept toward the south-west. This extension, designed by local architects, Hall and Prentice was not designed to emulate the earlier Victorian building, rather a stripped classical architecture was employed. The chapel was re-furbished in 1968 in line with the recently produced guidelines for changes of Roman Catholic services determined by Vatican II Council. The centrally facing dark stained timber pews were replaced with light pine seating facing the new, more centrally located altar.

Within the garden to the south of the chapel a small brick building was constructed in 1915 to designs of prominent local architect George Henry Male Addison, to house a life size sculpture of Jesus' crucifixion. This was erected by builder, J. Bowen whose tender price was £130. A grotto, located on the northern side of the convent, and a statue of Our Lady on the circular driveway, in the front of the convent were on the grounds by the early 1930s.

=== The Wall, Lodge and Gate ===
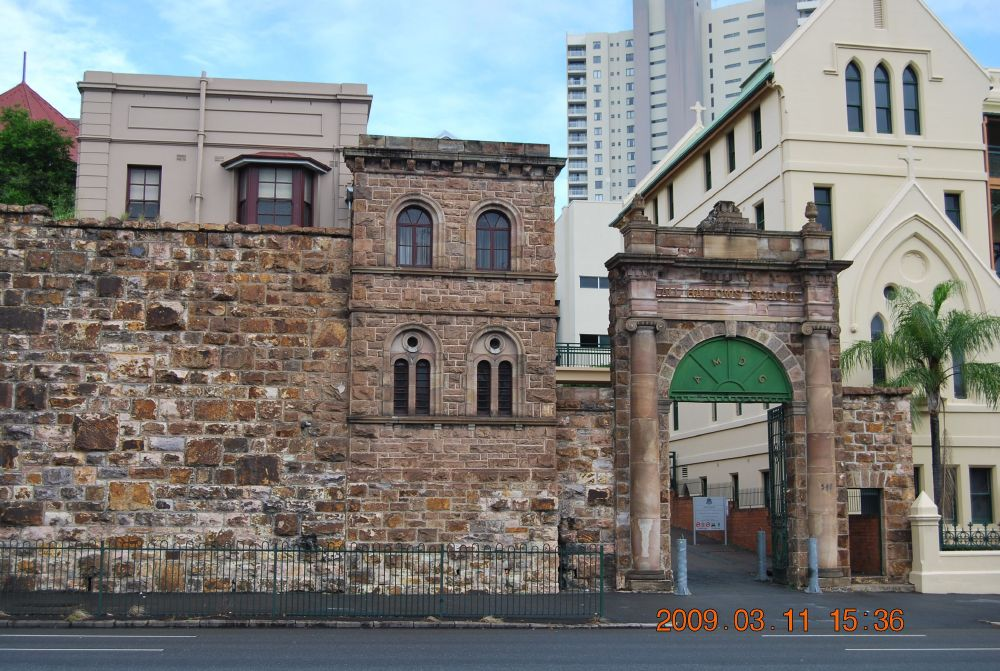
The Wall, Lodge and Gate, viewed from Ann Street, 2009

The environment on Duncan's Hill gradually changed as what was formerly named High Road was renamed Ann Street, and this was cut down by 15 feet (4.6 m) in 1865. From that time the convent at All Hallows' began to be perceived as situated at the top of a cliff-face rather than, as previously, at the apex of a gentle hill. Ann Street was subject to three more cuts, in 1876, 1886 and finally in 1927, when it took its present form.

The cutting down of Ann Street in 1876 necessitated the rebuilding of the original 1865 wall, which saw it extended along Ann Street. In 1879, three years after the reconstruction of the wall a stone gatekeeper's lodge and entrance gateway were constructed to designs of Rev. Joseph Augustine Canali, an architect and engineer who arrived from Italy at the behest of Quinn in 1872 with the intention of joining the priesthood in Queensland which he did in 1879. The builders for the project were O'Keefe, Masterson and Martin who constructed the lodge and gateway for a cost of £3473/8/1. The gatehouse, which seems to have replaced an earlier structure built with Adderton, served as the convent almonry for many years after its construction.

Another cutting of Ann Street took place in 1886 and the final cutting in 1927 saw the wall increased in length, extending around into Kemp Place. At this time a base was added to the gatehouse making it level with the new road and the gate was lowered.

=== The Main Building ===
As the school and convent increased in size and the Sisters of Mercy became wealthier, incentive arose to acquire the entire block on which the convent stood, bordered by Ann Street, Kemp Place, Ivory Street and Boundary Street. In December 1879 land on the Ivory Street side of the site was purchased from James Ivory for £2173, for the construction of a separate school building, overlooking the Brisbane River.

Bishop Quinn laid the foundation stone of the building on January 2, 1881. The architect for the project was Andrea Giovanni Stombuco, a Florentine who moved Australia in 1851 and to Brisbane in 1875. Upon his arrival in the country Stombuco worked variously as a monumental mason, sculptor and builder, before becoming an architect, a profession for which he claims he was self-taught. As an artisan, Stombuco undertook much work for the Catholic Church and the church was to become his primary patron when he began practice as an architect. On advice from the church Stombuco moved to Brisbane and may have taken up a position offered by Quinn as Diocesan architect. Among the buildings he designed for the Catholic Church were St Joseph's Christian Brothers Schools at both Gregory Terrace (1875–6) and Nudgee (1889–90); Rathbawn (1875–8) a home for Quinn at Nudgee; several churches including Laidley (1878), Pine Mountain (1878), Sacred Heart at Sandgate (1880–1), Church of the Holy Cross, Wooloowin (1886) and St Joseph's at Kangaroo Point (1887–8).

The All Hallows' school building, which has become known as the Main Building, was constructed by Edward Vallely and completed in late 1882 at a cost of £8899/2/0. The original building was a substantial three storeyed structure, with a central tower dividing two symmetrically arranged wings featuring open arcaded loggias to the lower two storeys. The central tower which appeared on the south eastern side of the building was planned by Bishop Quinn as his own office, where he could oversee the development and management of the school curriculum. However, before the building was completed Quinn died and Robert Dunne was appointed his successor.

The Main Building housed class rooms, boarders' accommodation and a concert hall. A separate two storeyed building to the north-east of the Main Building was constructed at this time to house music practice rooms.

By 1901 space in the Main Building was insufficient and a further wing was planned for the Main Building to designs of local architects, Hall and Dods, a partnership of Francis Richard Hall and Robert Smith Dods and the extension was constructed by John Watson. This wing which extended toward the north-west was very similar in detail to the original building, continuing the arcading, roof line and detailing. The extension included a boarders' dining room, an extension of the concert hall, another stairhall fitted with a fine timber stair and additional boarding accommodation.

Thomas Ramsay Hall, a local architect and half-brother of Francis Hall, designed a further extension wing to the Main Building in 1919, perpendicular to the existing building and incorporating the building housing the early music practice rooms. Two further additions were made to this wing of the Main Building, extending it north west, to designs of architects Prentice and Atkinson in 1934 and in 1940. These later additions continued the arcading on the south-western facade and extended it along to disguise the early music practice rooms. Prentice and Atkinson were also responsible for the addition of a lavatory and bathroom block on the north east of the building in 1933. With the phasing out of the boarders from All Hallows' from 1969 changes were made to the Main Building, turning former accommodation quarters into classrooms.

=== St Ann's Industrial School ===
The gold rush period of the 1850s and 1860s in Australia saw more concern and governmental involvement with the care of homeless children. Officials were given powers to place neglected and delinquent children in institutions often offering religious as well as technical training, modelled on the English district union schools.

Following the Industrial and Reformatory Schools Act of 1865, which regulated the detention of neglected and criminal children, the Sisters established an industrial school in 1868 in rented cottages adjacent to All Hallows'. St Ann's Industrial School, as it became known, was concerned with the full-time education of young girls in domestic arts and sciences, including cooking, dressmaking and needlework. The Sisters established the Industrial School to continue the training of young girls leaving St Vincent's orphanage at Nudgee, in an attempt to prolong their entry in the workforce, where the state age for discharge could be as low as ten years. However St Ann's was soon accepting full fee paying students. Work produced at the school was exhibited nationally and the institute became a highly regarded training centre.

In 1876 the school's Liquidation Committee approved the construction of a new building to house the Industrial School and land previously rented by the Sisters was purchased from the estate of George Poole for £3000. This land faced Ann Street to the south west of the main entrance.

Andrea Stombuco, the designer of the Main Building at All Hallows', called tenders for the construction of an Industrial School in the early 1880s, but financial constraints delayed the construction of the building. Tenders were again called in 1893, to revised designs of FDG Stanley and Son, and the contractors Woollam and Norman who had only recently finished the construction of the extensions to the All Hallows' Convent, were commissioned as builders for the project. Messrs Leach and Son were the decorators employed. St Ann's was completed for a cost of about £7000 and officially opened by the Queensland Governor, Sir Henry Wylie Norman on July 15, 1894. A newspaper report of the opening in The Age gave the following account of the nature of the school:

"As it is well-known the institution is largely self-supporting, being the abode of dress-makers, lace and fancy needle workers. St Ann's has gradually grown until now it assumes the position of an important destroyer of the nonsensical fallacies of free-trade which have blighted colonial youth in the past. We hope the children will grow in goodness and usefulness, and that a kindred institution will, in the early future, be established for boys where they may acquire useful trades."

An Industrial School for boys was, indeed, established by Archbishop Dunne in the printing offices of the Catholic newspaper, The Australian.

Changes in the education system saw the partial closure of St Ann's in the 1940s, when the building became used as a boarding house for young women studying at university or working in the city. In 1964 an extensive refurbishment of the building was undertaken which converted the lower floors of the building into classrooms, anticipating the future growth of the school.

=== Other Buildings ===
All Hallows' School and Convent have seen many periods of concentrated growth; the 1880s and early 1890s saw the construction of the Main Building, and the first major extension of the convent. During the 1920s and 30s the convent was again extended, the Main Building was extended twice and several small buildings were constructed including the chaplains residency, St Brigids and an art studio.

The art studio was constructed between the north eastern wing of the Main Building and the Convent in 1922 to designs of local architects, Hall and Prentice at a cost of £1437. This small one storeyed masonry structure was designed to maximise natural lighting, with large windows and skylighting and an open plan. A similar art studio was constructed at Lourdes Hill School in 1923.

Hall and Prentice, or the later firm of Hall and Phillips which formed with the dissolution of the previous partnership in 1929, are thought to have designed two other buildings on the campus, as well as the before mentioned extension of the chapel in 1921. These are a chaplain's residence constructed in 1936, abutting the gatekeeper's lodge above the Ann Street wall and St Brigids, a classroom block, built in 1924. These two buildings have similar classical detailing to that found on Hall and Phillips' extension of the nearby chapel.

Adjacent to St Brigids is a small octagonal building of one storey, with a high pitched pyramidal roof which was apparently constructed as an aviary, but is now used for classroom and meeting space.

Later buildings extant on the site include McCauley Hall which was constructed as the first catholic teachers' college in Queensland in 1958; Aquinas Hall a four storeyed building containing language, history and science laboratories, designed by Frank Cullen and Partners and opened in 1964 to which a science and library wing were added in 1972 and extended in 1978; and, most recently, Loreto Hall, a gymnasium complex, incorporating a large auditorium and art rooms designed by George Thiedke and opened in 1985. Loreto Hall replaced one of the very few buildings on the site known to have been demolished, a small one storeyed building known as Nazareth. This was constructed in 1952 for use by the lower primary school, and with the closing of the primary school in 1981, Nazareth was used for art rooms until its demolition.

In 1913 All Hallows' became the home of one of the first school swimming pools in Queensland, which was replaced in 1960 by the extant pool and associated buildings.

== Description ==
All Hallows' Convent and School is prominently situated in Fortitude Valley on a site bounded by Ann Street, Kemp Place, Ivory Street, Antrim Street and Boundary Street. A masonry retaining wall surrounds the school on the Ann Street and Kemp Place boundaries. The site commands views over Spring Hill, the Brisbane River and the Brisbane CBD.

Generally the buildings on the site are introspectively arranged, focussed on a central terraced area which, in turn, overlooks the Brisbane River, over Petrie Bight. The principal entrance to the school grounds is through the gateway off Ann Street, where access is provided to a driveway which passes through the school and convent grounds before leaving at the only other access point, off Kemp Place.

The buildings which comprise the site include the convent complex; St Ann's, the former Industrial School; the Main Building; McCauley Hall, a former teachers' college, Aquinas Hall and the library; Loreto, the gymnasium and auditorium complex; and several smaller structures including the former art studio, St Brigid's classrooms, a chaplain's residence, a gatekeeper's lodge and gateway. Along with these, are several landscaped areas which contribute to the setting of the buildings including the central terraced area, the flagpole lawn, playing fields to the north of the site and extensive gardens.

=== The Convent ===
The convent complex consists of the principal convent building which comprises Adderton, the chapel and various additions; a House of Mercy and a timber laundry.

The convent is a substantial four storeyed masonry building, consisting of a central section in which the early building, Adderton, is contained, and flanking this transverse wings semi-enclosing a rear courtyard on three sides. Within this courtyard is a U-planned building-the former House of Mercy. To the north-west of the convent, between this building and the Ann Street boundary is a lawn and early timber laundry building.

The central section of the convent runs south west-north east, parallel to the Ann Street boundary wall, the south western wing houses the chapel and is symmetrical with the three storeyed north eastern wing used for bedrooms and community. The convent, as it now appears, was completed in three major stages, manifest in design and construction; the 1850s house, Adderton, the 1891–2 extension and the chapel extension of 1921.

The south eastern facade, where the principal entrance is located, is terminated at both ends by the projecting elevations of the transverse wings. These bays have hipped roofs partially concealed by a decorative parapeted gable, surmounted at the apex by a pedimented feature, supported on reeded pilasters and flanked by pilasters surmounted by finials. Various round and square-headed arched openings, with both recessed and projecting surrounds are found symmetrically arranged on the elevation of the end bays. The south western wing has a more recent one storeyed entrance porch providing access to the chapel. The rendered masonry porch of rectangular plan has two round headed arched openings within a round headed arched recess, and moulded string courses and is surmounted by an entablature above which is an Italianate balustrade.

The building, over the central section and north eastern wing, has a hipped slate roof, and spaced regularly along the roof line of the north-east and south-east facades are decorative Anglo-Dutch gables. Roof vents line the ridge. The central section and north-eastern wing are surrounded by two storeys of verandahs, on the lower and first floors of the building. Supporting the corrugated iron verandah awning are cast iron columns, occasionally paired. The verandah features cast iron balustrading with the intertwined letters AHC within the pattern, cast iron frieze panels and column brackets. The window openings which line the principal facade have fixed louvre timber shutters.

Many features of the original home, Adderton, remain extant including its facade to the south east, with early window openings and doorway over which is an elliptical fanlight fitted with a stained glass panel.

The half-glazed entrance door opens onto an entrance vestibule, flanked to the north and south by parlours, and screened from a central hallway running parallel to the facade, by an elliptical arced opening fitted with a four panel glazed timber screen. Each parlour is fitted with a marble fireplace and two finely mullioned 12 paned vertical sash windows, one panel of which is stained. Beyond the screen and within the central hallway is a geometric timber stair, winding to the first floor with square sectioned balusters from each tread and a timber handrail following the complex curvature of the stair.

The central hallway, which is repeated on each floor provides access to the many small rooms and is broken by a series of plaster archways. Internally the convent has rendered masonry walls, plaster ceilings and covered timber floors. Early fireplaces, ovens and other fittings remain extant in the unrendered basement level of the convent.

The chapel wing comprises two sections: the earlier 1890 chapel toward the front elevation of the building and extending from the rear of this the 1921 extension. Externally, the extension employs stripped classical detailing with rusticated pilasters dividing the external walls and separating the round headed arched openings. Other detailing includes a projecting base, moulded string courses, enlarged keystone detailing above the arched openings and moulded entablature forming a parapet some of which is surmounted by an Italianate baluster detail above. The chapel has a traditional plan, with central nave, side aisles, polygonal sanctuary and a shallow transept extending from the south-western end of the building.

Internally the variations of material, construction and detailing clearly indicates the two phases of the construction of the chapel. The rear, earlier section, which extends approximately one-third of the length of the nave features coffered ceilings of stained timber and timber panelled walls. An arcade supported on marbelised columns separates this section from the 1921 extension. On the floor above the rear section of the chapel is a pipe organ which opens onto the nave extension through a large archway.

The interior of the chapel extension, like the exterior, has a classical design influence with round headed archways and openings, neo-classical painted decoration and classical mouldings. The nave has shallow side aisles divided from the body by a nave arcade of round headed arched openings with moulded architraves and large plaster keystones, all supported on marbelised columns with decorative plaster capitals. The barrel vaulted ceiling of the nave, is punctuated with operable clerestory windows and these are separated by moulded ribs. The sanctuary, which is divided from the nave by a round headed archway supported on substantial red marble columns, is semi-circular in plan and covered by a half domed ceiling. Within this space is a large painting of Jesus flanked by arched stained glass windows from FX Zettler in Munich, and higher on the rear wall is a small rose window. Painted decoration cover most of the surfaces in the sanctuary area.

The former House of Mercy, located within the rear courtyard of the convent is a two-storeyed U-planned rendered masonry building. External walkways line elevations closest to the convent and these provided access to the many small timber rooms which constitute the building. The ground floor of this houses larger rooms.

To the rear of the convent is a simple timber building, with gabled roof and large roof ventilators used as a laundry.

=== The Main Building ===
The Main Building, the principal school building of All Hallows' is situated in the eastern corner of the block overlooking the Brisbane River and with extensive views of the Brisbane CBD and Kangaroo Point. The design of the three storeyed stone building is strongly inspired by classical architecture, particularly that of Renaissance Italy. This influence informs the composition and detailing of the arcaded facades and general planning of the building.

The 1882 section of the building extends along the north eastern boundary of the All Hallows' block, the 1901 extension is situated abutting the north east end of the original building and later extensions are perpendicular to these, extending north west from the original wing and incorporating the early music rooms. The building, although the result of five phases of construction completed over about 60 years, is reasonably cohesive, particularly on those elevations facing inward toward the central open spaces of the school. These facades are all lined with arcaded loggias similar to those found encircling the original 1882 section of the building.

The building is essentially rectangular in plan, with a long rectangular wing extending north west from the eastern corner of the building. The shallow pitched hipped roof of wide gauge corrugated iron is partially concealed by an Italianate parapet. Projecting through the roof at regular intervals are squat pyramidal roofed towers. These are vertical extensions of projecting bays on the facade of the building. The projecting entrance bay of the original 1882 building is emphasised by pediments at the roof line and a larger tower with a very steeply pitched roof ornamented with cast iron cresting.

Arcaded loggias, sections of which have been infilled with glazing, are found on the ground and first floors with round headed arched window openings on the second floor. The openings of the arcades and the windows are divided by pilastered wall sections.

The principal entrance of the earliest section of the south eastern, emphasised by the projecting bay is through a recent double timber door surmounted by semi-circular fanlight fitted within an early arched opening. Beyond this door is an entrance vestibule and through another panelled and moulded double timber door with semi circular fanlight and sidelights, access is given to the stair hall. The entrance vestibule has tessellated ceramic tiles on the floor and a moulded plaster ceiling. The dark stained timber stair, beyond this entrance, is dog legged with half-landings at each turn. On the first floor, this stair arrives in a room between a concert hall and a music library. The concert hall has a coffered plaster ceiling with recent mouldings and round headed arched windows with vertical sash fittings, opening onto the loggia spaces. At the north eastern end of the hall is a timber stage accessed via wide shallow stairs from the main body of the room. Beneath the stage are music practice rooms. The music library features a white marble fireplace, dark stained timber joinery, and round headed arched openings fitted with French doors opening onto the loggia. Small stairways on the second floor give access to the tower rooms above.

The plan of the building has large rooms connected to stairhalls and other rooms by loggias and walkways on the two external faces of the building. This plan continues in the abutting wing, but with walkways located only along the arcaded, south western elevation, giving access to the rooms. Stairhalls are located near the principal entrance of the Main Building (1882), in the eastern corner of the building (1901) and centrally in the extension (1919). Two sets of concrete fire escape stairs and a lift are also found within the building.

The north western wing of the Main Building continues the external detailing of the earlier sections on its south western, inward facing, facade only. The south eastern facade of the wing, viewed from the Kemp Place boundary of the site provides evidence of the growth of the building, with four phases of development readily apparent in the roof lines, levels and detailing.

Incorporated in the later wing, and disguised on the south western face with subsequent arcading, is an early two storeyed building housing music practice rooms. These are located centrally, and are apparent on the north eastern facade. The building is of rendered brick and has an ornamental roof ventilator centrally located on the steeply pitched hipped roof. Small rectangular window openings line the north eastern face. The floor levels of this building are not aligned with the floor levels of the surrounding buildings, therefore small internal staircases provide access to the rooms. The music practice rooms, themselves, are evident on the ground floor of this building.

Abutting the north east face of the Main Building is a tuckshop wing, which is an amalgamation of a 1933 concrete building with a corrugated iron gambrel roof and a later c. 1960s brick addition. The 1933 section retains its roof form and external detailing which consists of recessed bays housing large rectangular window openings separated by shallow pilasters.

=== St Ann's ===
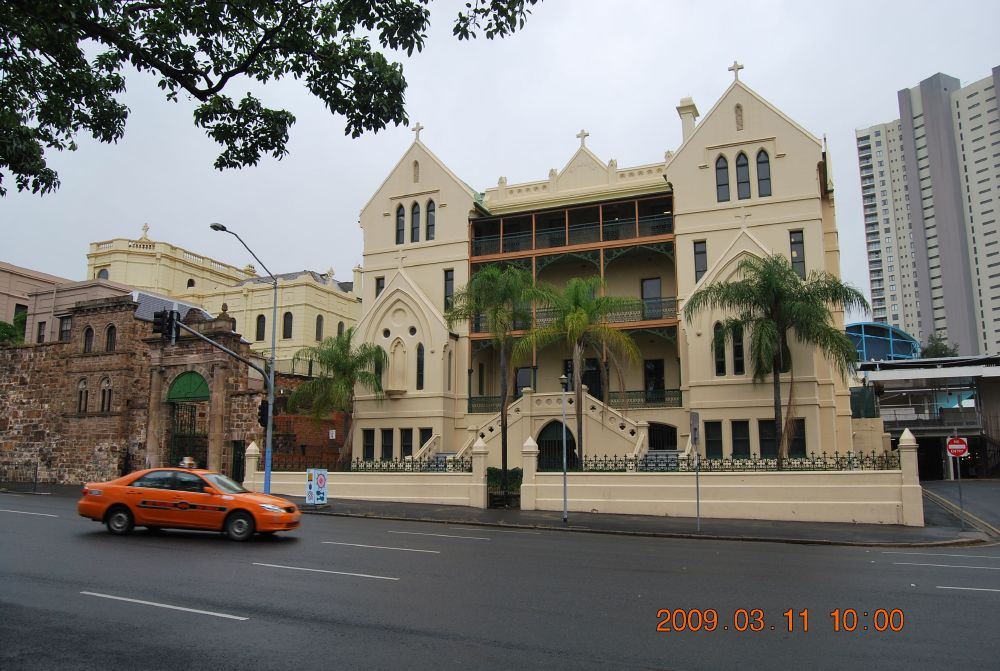
St Ann's, seen from Ann Street, 2009

St Ann's is a substantial three storeyed rendered masonry building with partial basement. Facing north west and situated on the Ann Street boundary of the school St Ann's is the only building on the site which addresses the street. The design of the building shows an influence of Gothic revival architecture particularly in the detailing of the Ann Street facade where pointed arched openings and mouldings, grouped lancet windows, steeply pitched parapeted gables and repeated use of the quatrefoil motif are found.

The building is symmetrically composed about a recessed central bay lined with three storeys of balconies on the front and rear elevations, flanked by transverse wings. These side wings have steeply pitched parapeted gables and at the level of the ground floor projecting bays whose gabled awnings reflect the gabled roof form. Grouped lancet windows under pointed and flat headed arched hood moulds on the second floor, small rose windows, statue niches and Latin Cross finials at the apex of the gables contribute to the ornamentation of the wings. The render on the Ann Street facade is scribed with ashlar coursing.

A central bi-furcating stairway, with substantial masonry balustrade featuring cut-out quatrefoils accesses the ground floor verandah of the building on the Ann Street facade. The verandah awning on the ground floor has a thin gauge corrugated iron soffit and is supported on reeded cast iron columns and has a cast iron balustrade and pointed arched friezes which also feature a quatrefoil motif. The verandah on the floor above has square timber columns, cast iron balustrading and a timber boarded soffit.

Centrally located on the ground floor verandah is a six panelled entrance door which is surrounded by rectangular transom window and sidelights of very fine stained glass panels from Munich. The entrance door opens onto a vestibule where access is provided to parlours on either side. A moulded round headed archway separates the vestibule from the central hallway, which runs parallel to the entrance facade of the building terminating at the chapel entrance to the north-east and in the stairhall to the south-west. Internally the building has rendered masonry walls throughout, timber boarded ceilings, timber floors, high-quality timber architraves, skirting boards and stairways.

The principal internal stair is housed in the stairhall which is expressed externally on the south-west facade with a projecting bay which features four pairs of rectangular stained glass window openings, signifying the level of each floor and the basement. The open well timber stair has turned timber balusters and carved newels and drops. Another, more simple, stair is housed in the southern corner of the building.

The chapel, located in north eastern wing of the ground floor of the building is a long room only the north western end of which was originally intended for this use. This end has a coffered timber ceiling with plaster mouldings, grisaille (or non-figured) stained glass panels in tre-foiled lancets and fine timber joinery. A sanctuary, at the north western end of the chapel, is separated by an elliptical headed archway, and houses a small marble altar flanked by single tre-foiled lancets fitted with figured stained glass panels. Access is provided from the central hallway to the chapel via a dark stained timber doorway with a pointed arch transom light above. Classrooms fill the remainder of the ground and first floors. The second floor houses several early bedroom cells lining the north west side of the building, with access to an enclosed verandah facing Ann Street. The basement of the building has remnants of early brick fireplaces.

Abutting the southern corner of St Ann's and extending to the south east is a one storeyed brick extension with hipped corrugated iron roof and verandah awning on the north eastern side supported on chamfered timber posts.

=== Other ===
As well as the larger buildings on the All Hallows' Convent and School site many smaller buildings are of cultural heritage significance. These include the Ann Street and Kemp Place retaining wall and incorporated gateway and lodge; a chaplain's residence, St Brigid's classroom block, the art studio and several areas of open space including the Terrace, gardens around the convent, playing fields and other open areas.

The porphyry retaining wall extends from the gateway, adjacent to St Ann's, on Ann Street, north east and is curved around the corner and finishes in Kemp Place. The wall, made from randomly coursed rock faced porphyry rubble, varies in height from 4 metres (13 ft) on the Kemp Place elevation to 14 metres (46 ft) on Ann Street. A course of stonework projects from the wall near the top of the structure.

Incorporated in the Ann Street face of the wall, adjacent to St Ann's is a gatekeeper's lodge and gateway. The gateway which is constructed from rock faced porphyry and smooth faced sandstone is the principal entrance to the school and provides access to the driveway. The symmetrically composed structure employs classical details. The opening is through a round headed archway, the arched section of which is filled with a cast iron plate bearing the letters AMDG. The surrounds of the archway including the voussoirs and keystone are of rough cut porphyry. Rounded and tapering pilasters with Ionic capitals, of smooth faced sandstone, flank the opening. A sandstone entablature surmounting the pilasters features a moulded cornice supported on corbels with a smaller sandstone architrave above. Sitting on the top of each end of the gateway are stone carvings of urns with flames rising from them. Centrally located on the architrave on four steps is a carved globe with a copper Latin cross surmounting it. Shorter porphyry walls flank the gateway.

Adjacent to the north of the gateway, is a gatekeepers' lodge whose Ann Street facade is a continuation of the school's retaining wall, the lodge being slightly taller than the adjacent wall. The building is two storeyed, and with the cutting down of Ann Street after the lodge's construction a retaining wall has been added as a base to the Ann Street facade of the building. This facade projects slightly from the face of the retaining wall and is detailed with smooth faced sandstone string coursing in line with the sill of the two storeys of windows. The steeply pitched hipped slate roof is concealed on the Ann Street facade by a parapet, being an entablature, consisting of a cornice with dentils surmounted by an architrave. Two storeys of round headed arched windows are featured on this facade, reflecting the early levels of the building. These windows differ in detail on each storey, the lower having sandstone tracery dividing the opening into two lancet windows with round arched heads and a circular opening between. The upper storey openings are simply round headed arched openings. Window and door openings on the south western wall indicate the previous entrance level of the building. Internally the building has timber floors throughout, plaster and lath walls, timber boarded ceilings, an early quarter-turn timber stair with turned balusters and simple timber architraves and skirting boards.

Adjoining the gatehouse is a small rendered masonry building used for a chaplain's residence. This is a one storeyed rendered brick building with stripped classical facades and detailing similar to that of the nearby chapel extension. The external walls which consist of recessed bays separated by rusticated pilasters, are parapeted with a simple entablature concealing the shallow hipped roof. Access is provided to the front door of the building down broad concrete steps with rendered masonry balustrading. The front door opens onto a semi-internal entrance hall with timber lattice screens. Internally the residence has two principal rooms, a living room beyond the entrance hall and from this a bedroom with ensuite bathroom. Internal finishes include pressed metal ceilings and cornices, rendered walls and chamfered timber skirting boards. The adjacent building, St Brigid's, is of similar detail and houses two classrooms with access provided to the interior via broad concrete steps. Between St Brigid's and the chaplain's residence is a hexagonally planned building with hexagonal pyramidal corrugated iron roof, originally in use as an aviary, but now a classroom.

The former art studio, located between the Main Building extension and the convent, is a single storeyed concrete building of simple rectangular plan with a hipped corrugated iron roof. The building was designed an art studio and therefore planned to provide abundant natural lighting and ventilation. The facade of the building is symmetrically composed around a central doorway flanking which are large window openings separated by pilasters with simple moulded capitals and bases and supporting a cornice, on which the overhanging corrugated iron roof sits.

McCauley Hall, situated on the northern corner of the site, is a four storeyed brick building with re-inforced concrete framing elements and a skillion roof. The building displays qualities of many post-war buildings of Australia showing a strong International style influence, whose physical attributes on this building include large planes of brickwork juxtaposed with textured panels and large areas of horizontally grouped window openings. Aquinas Hall has similar construction and detailing, and is a four storeyed brick building with re-inforced concrete framing externally expressed.

In the gardens adjacent to the chapel is a small polychrome brick building which houses life-size statues commemorating Jesus' death on Calvary. This structure has a gabled roof flanked by brick pinnacles, all surrounding the round headed arched opening through which the statues are seen.

Much of the open space, garden areas and established trees are of importance to the setting and understanding of the school. In particular the split-level Terrace, an open lawned area forming a central court which retains a vista toward the river via a small lawn to the south-west of the Main Building. St Gertrude's playing grounds in the northern corner of the school is an established area with important planting including a bougainvillea hedge and a large weeping fig. The gardens surrounding the convent provide a buffer zone between this and the other, more public, buildings on the site. These areas are the chapel garden, the driveway, the former kitchen garden to the north-east and the lawn between the convent and Ann Street which houses many rotary washing lines. There are many large established trees on the site.

== Heritage listing ==
All Hallows Convent and School was listed on the Queensland Heritage Register on 21 October 1992 having satisfied the following criteria.

The place is important in demonstrating the evolution or pattern of Queensland's history.

All Hallows' Convent was the first permanent home of the Sisters of Mercy in Queensland and has remained a focal point for their activities until the present day. From All Hallows' the Sisters of Mercy have established convents over the State from where their educational and social programmes are implemented. All Hallows' provides evidence of the development of the order in Queensland.

All Hallows' School is the oldest surviving secondary school in Brisbane and is able to demonstrate the pattern of development of education particularly in privately managed schools in Queensland.

The school and convent have remained an important feature of the Catholic Church in Queensland throughout the site's 130-year history reflected in the active interest of Archbishops Quinn, Dunne and Duhig in the planning and development of the institution.

The place demonstrates rare, uncommon or endangered aspects of Queensland's cultural heritage.

Several of the buildings on the site provide evidence of early social and cultural customs which are no longer practiced. St Ann's is one of the few Industrial Schools in Brisbane and thus provides rare evidence of earlier forms of technical education. The gatehouse acted as an almonry for many years and this was always an important element of the Sisters' social programmes. The convent, incorporating the former House of Mercy demonstrates the manner in which the Sisters of Mercy extended charity to whom they considered unfortunate women.

The core of the convent at All Hallow's is one of the earliest surviving houses in Brisbane, Adderton built for Dr George Fullerton in the 1850s. Features which remain extant from this building include a rare Queensland example of a geometric spiral stair, early glazing and timber joinery.

The place has potential to yield information that will contribute to an understanding of Queensland's history.

Archaeological investigations of Adderton would, potentially, reveal early building construction techniques, materials and early land use of the site.

The place is important in demonstrating the principal characteristics of a particular class of cultural places.

There has been considerable change on the site, though very little demolition of buildings, and therefore the site retains an intact record of the growth of the school. The introspective nature of the site planning and the relationship among the various provide an intact physical manifestation of the catholic ethos of female education during the nineteenth and twentieth century.

The place is important because of its aesthetic significance.

The All Hallows' site is a prominent element of inner Brisbane, and in particular the Fortitude Valley area. The school and convent is a major landmark in Brisbane, given prominence by the dramatic skyline of the major buildings. The site is planned with cohesion, consciously introspective around central courts, manifesting traditional collegiate planning.

Several individual buildings have architectural merit, and together, form an important compendium of the works of many of Brisbane's premier architectural practitioners and firms. The site contains both large scale buildings which are prominently sited and well-designed, as well as more humble structures which contribute to the contextual environment of the larger buildings.

Individually the buildings are of aesthetic and architectural value. The Georgian proportion and restraint of Adderton influenced the additions of the Convent which is a well-sited and composed building suited to Brisbane's sub-tropical climate. Several of the 1920s and 1930s buildings on the site including the chapel extension, St Brigid's, the chaplain's residence and the art studio, are well composed buildings manifesting an influence of inter-war classicism. The former St Ann's Industrial School of 1894 is a well composed building with Gothic revival detailing and is an important element of Ann Street. The 1882 Main Building is, again, a well-composed building with sensitive additions and a good example of educational building design of the Victorian period. Aquinas Hall is a well-articulated building of the post-war period. Many of the garden areas and established trees contribute to the picturesque qualities of the place. The open areas of the school allow these buildings to maintain a close relationship with the river and surrounding areas whilst also providing appropriate settings.

Many individual features of the building are of very high quality and have significance for their craftsmanship. Such features include the timber joinery and stained glass panels in the Main Building, Convent and St Ann's.

The place has a strong or special association with a particular community or cultural group for social, cultural or spiritual reasons.

The school and convent has associations with many people of importance to Queensland history including Archbishops Quinn, Dunne and Duhig; Mother Mary Vincent Whitty who established the Sisters of Mercy in Queensland; and Mother Mary Potter who was a long time superior of the order. Many prominent Queensland architects and builders are associated with the site including Andrew Petrie, Andrea Stombuco, FDG Stanley, Hunter and Corrie, Hall and Dods, Hall and Prentice, GHM Addison and Frank Cullen.

The place has a special association with the life or work of a particular person, group or organisation of importance in Queensland's history.

All Hallows' has special associations with various groups in Queensland; the Catholic Church as their major secondary school for females; the Sisters of Mercy as their head convent and principal school and the school community.
