= Jane Gorry =

(1844–1891) Australian Sister of Mercy and first postulant in Queensland

Personal life
- Born: 16 February 1844 Ipswich, Australia
- Died: 1891 Brisbane, Australia

Religious life
- Religion: Christianity
- Denomination: Roman Catholic
- Order: Sisters of Mercy
- Monastic name: Sister Mary de Sales

Jane Gorry (1844-1891) was the first Queensland postulant of the Sisters of Mercy.

== Biography ==
Gorry was born in Ipswich on 16 February 1844. She was educated by the Benedictine nuns of Subiaco, Sydney, who had a small school attached to their convent.

Just over a year after the first group of Sisters of Mercy led by Mother Vincent Whitty arrived in Queensland from Ireland on 10 May 1861, Jane Gorry joined them as a postulant on 24 May 1862. She was the first Queensland woman to become an aspirant with the Order. Gorry was welcomed into the Order as a novice on 22 February 1863 and took the religious name of Sister Mary de Sales. She was professed in 1865. Mother Vincent Whitty described her as straight forward, helpful in teaching, healthy and likely to be a good sister.

Mother Vincent Whitty took Sister Mary de Sales, Mother M. Benedict and Sr M. Joseph Murphy (a novice from Athy, Ireland) to Ipswich to open a school there on 1 May 1863. 180 children attended on the first day. The Sisters lived in a rented house and walked to and from St Mary's School which was in the grounds of St Mary's Church, Ipswich. Although Mother Vincent still had responsibilities in Brisbane, she remained teaching in the school until mid June and was a frequent visitor after that and she lived at St Mary's Convent, Ipswich from 1865 to 1869, teaching in the school during that time.

Gorry returned to Brisbane where she taught in St Stephen's School (behind the original St Stephen's Cathedral) and later at All Hallows' School (opened on 1 November 1863) for a number of years. When inviting the Sisters to Ipswich, parishioners had promised to provide a convent. The foundation stone for a convent was laid in 1864 and the convent opened in 1865 with a boarding school at the rear. It was located near the corner of Mary and Elizabeth Streets beside the first stone church. The Convent was a two-storied brick building with a gabled roof.

Gorry was chosen by Mother Vincent Whitty to accompany her on a journey to Ireland to seek more sisters for Queensland. They first visited Sydney, Melbourne and Geelong before crossing to Hobart when Bishop James Quinn recalled them to Brisbane. On their return journey, they visited orphanages and other welfare institutions with a view to establishing something similar in Brisbane.

In 1873, Gorry was appointed as the first Superior of the new foundation in Rockhampton. The sisters arrived on 4 August 1873. Mother Vincent Whitty led the group consisting of Mother Mary de Sales, Sisters M. Xavier, Sister M. Benigna, and three other sisters. A cottage in Kent St became their first Convent. Mother Vincent remained with them until December 1873. They established a Non-Vested school where the sisters teaching the State Government approved curriculum received a government stipend but were not allowed to teach religion. Sister Mary de Sales and another Sister went to the school after-hours to give religious instruction. In 1880, the Queensland government withdrew the payment of teaching salaries for Sisters. To ensure some income, a select class was added to the Kent St School where fee-paying students received a broader education than the basic state primary curriculum. Subjects such as music, languages, fine art and needlework were added to the curriculum. Gorry was well prepared for teaching such subjects as this was the type of education she had received from the Benedictine nuns in Sydney.

In May 1882, when Rockhampton was made a separate diocese, the Sisters of Mercy working in Rockhampton were given the choice of remaining there and forming a new congregation of Sisters of Mercy or of returning to their original congregation in Brisbane. Gorry chose to return to the Brisbane Congregation.

Gorry was appointed Superior of Dalby Convent in 1884. In 1889, she was appointed Superior of the Maryborough Convent but returned to Brisbane two years later. She continued to teach until her death from a stroke in 1891, aged 47, at All Hallows' Convent, Brisbane.

== Legacy ==
Sister Jane Gorry (RSM) has a House named after her at both St Mary's College (Ipswich) and the All Hallows' School, in Brisbane. A park in Augustine Heights has also been named in her honour by the Ipswich City Council.
