= Petrie Bight Retaining Wall =

Historic embankment in Brisbane, Queensland

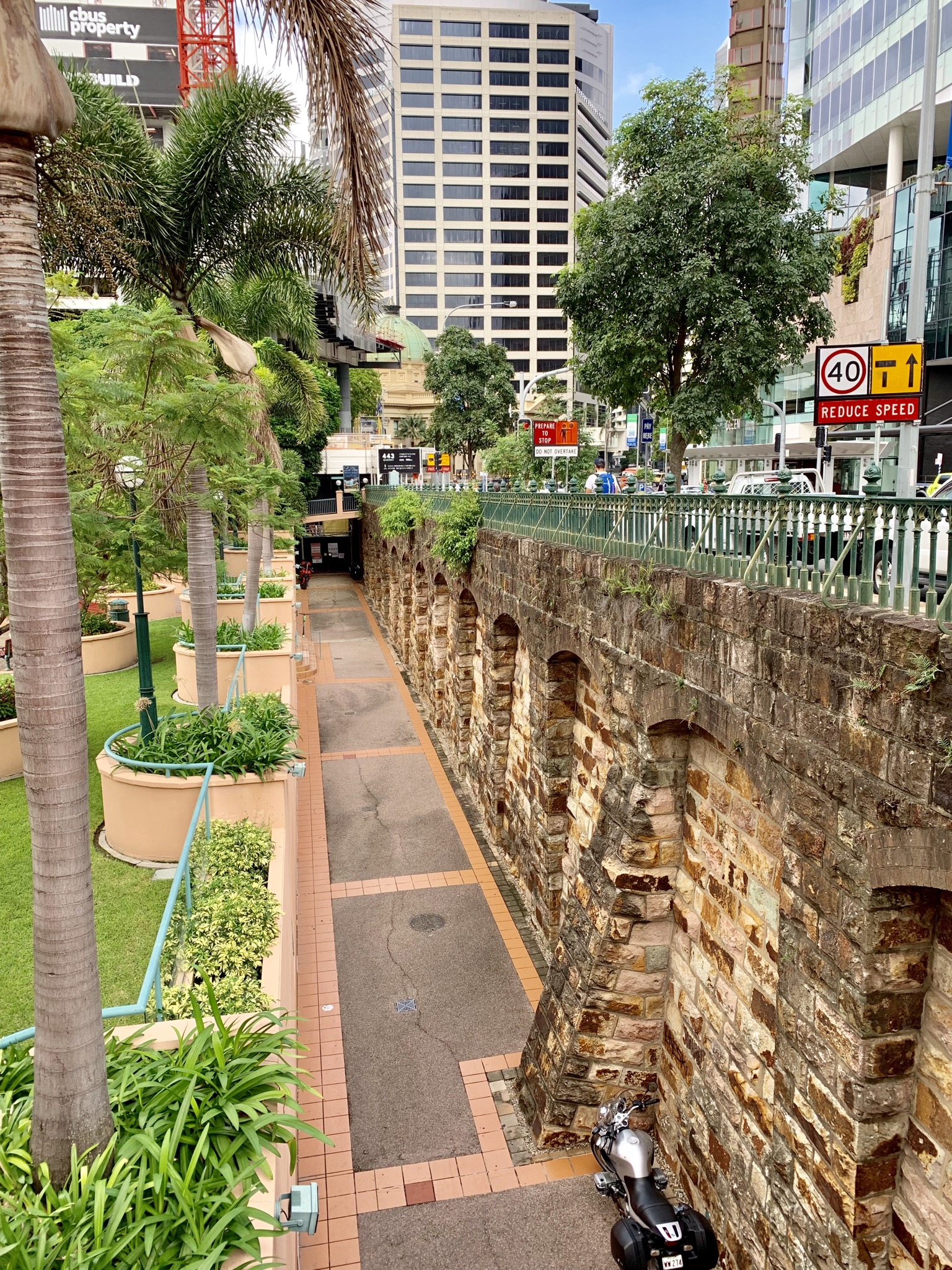
- Petrie Bight Retaining Wall

- Location within Queensland Location within Australia
- 27.4645°S 153.0314°E
- Location: 443–501 Queen Street, Brisbane City, City of Brisbane, Queensland, Australia

History
- Design period: 1870s–1890s (late 19th century)
- Built: 1881–1882

Queensland Heritage Register
- Official name: Petrie Bight Retaining Wall
- Type: state heritage (built)
- Designated: 21 October 1992
- Reference no.: 600159
- Significant period: 1880s (fabric)
- Significant components: post/s – lamp, fencing, wall/s – retaining
- Builders: Henry Patten

Petrie Bight Retaining Wall is a heritage-listed embankment at 443–501 Queen Street, Brisbane City, City of Brisbane, Queensland, Australia. It was built from 1881 to 1882 by Henry Patten. It was added to the Queensland Heritage Register on 21 October 1992.

== History ==
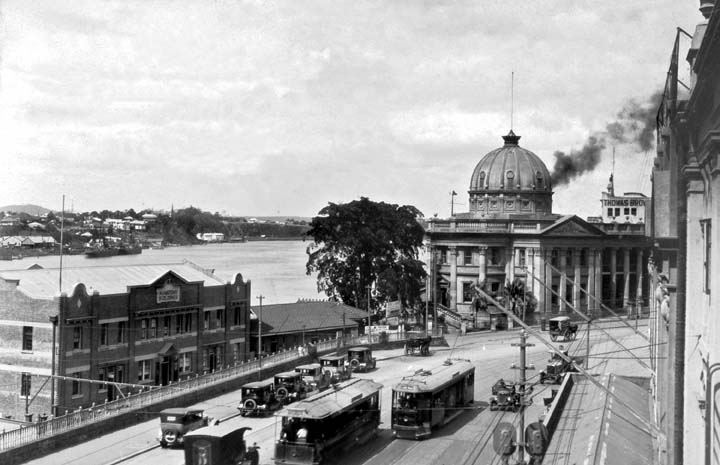
The balustrading of the Petrie Bight retaining wall is visible to the left of Queen Street, 1926

This retaining wall was built in 1881–1882 for the Brisbane Municipal Council. The contractor for the project was Henry Patten and the cast-iron balustrading was manufactured locally by Smith Forrester & Co.

In 1880, after the Council purchased Kennedy Wharf (just downstream on the Petrie Bight of the Brisbane River from the present Customs House), they obtained a loan of £7000 to build the retaining wall and extend Kennedy Wharf to Macrossan Street. Besides providing more working space behind the wharves, the wall marked the recently widened alignment of Queen Street.

In 1887 the City Engineer reported that the wall was out of plumb by 9 inches (230 mm) in 100 yards (91 m). In consequence, the wall was stabilised by the addition of eight engaged buttresses.

Use of the Petrie Bight area changed after the 1940s when downstream shipping facilities were established, and the area below the retaining wall became available for development. One such development saw the establishment of a landscaped recreation area beside a car park.

Recent alterations since 1988 have seen about 20 metres (66 ft) of the wall dismantled and reconstructed on a new alignment. The parapet has been breached in three places with openings ranging from 5 to 8 metres (16 to 26 ft) wide. One of the openings now houses a reinforced concrete stairway which leads to a five-storey building erected on the river side of the wall.

== Description ==
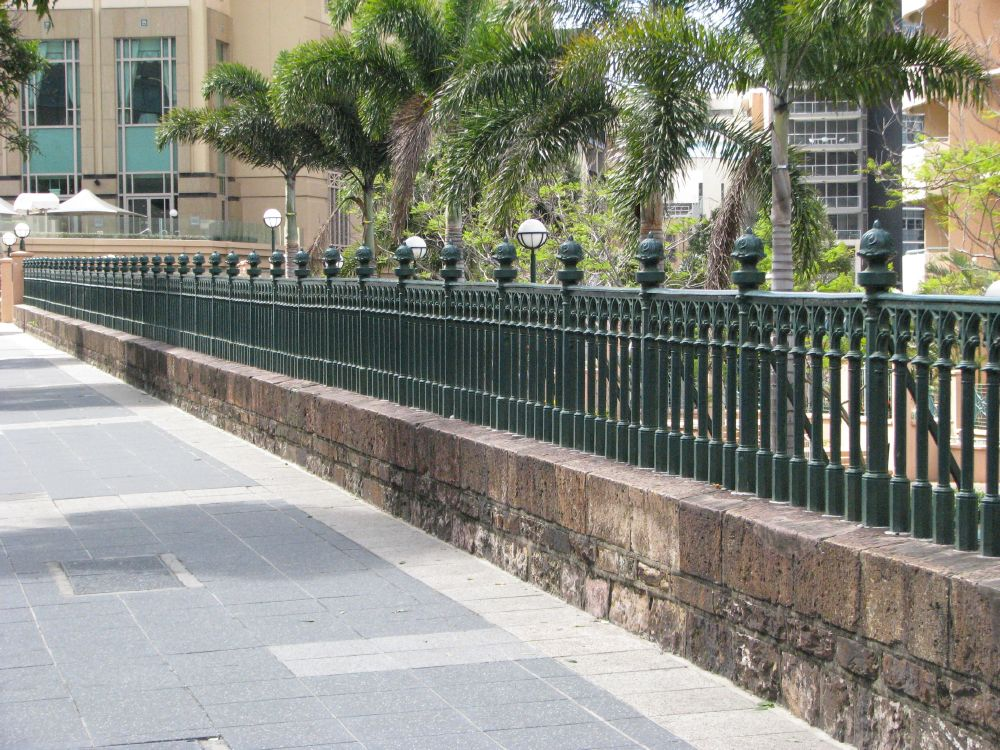
Cast iron railways as seen from Queen Street, 2008

This 150-metre-long (490 ft), parapeted retaining wall, ranging in height from 5 to 9 metres (16 to 30 ft), is built of Brisbane tuff. The blocks are laid in courses and surmounted by a detailed cast-iron railing which incorporates one of the two original lamp standards and terminates in a sandstone endpost at the Customs House end of the wall. At the northern end of the wall, eight engaged buttresses, added only a few years after construction of the wall, afford further support.

The arches provide rhythm to the mass of the wall while the finely detailed balustrade adds an effect of light and space. The distinctive pinks, greens and browns of the Brisbane tuff contribute to the aesthetic appeal of the wall.

As the wall was backfilled with rock to the present level of Queen Street, only the parapet and railing are visible from the street. From the river side, however, the wall with its varying depths and distinctive arches and supporting pilasters is clearly visible.

The wall is largely intact despite several modifications.

The wall appears in an Orient Line postcard of 1895 painted by Arthur Henry Fullwood. Its appearance there does not seem to accord exactly with its history. The buttresses seem to be omitted and reflection in water is suggested.

The wall is shown also in a 1905 postcard photo.

The tuff retaining wall in nearby Arch Lane to the north is not part of the Petrie Bight retaining wall. The Arch Lane wall was built by the Brisbane Gas Company in 1883. Arch Lane was developed in 1920.

== Heritage listing ==
Petrie Bight Retaining Wall was listed on the Queensland Heritage Register on 21 October 1992 having satisfied the following criteria.

The place is important in demonstrating the evolution or pattern of Queensland's history.

The Petrie Bight Retaining Wall is important in illustrating the development of Brisbane's road and wharf facilities by the Brisbane Municipal Council in the late 19th century. Construction of the wall was associated closely with municipal acquisition of Kennedy Wharf, and reflects the Council's developing role in providing improved transportation facilities in Brisbane. It survives as an example of a major engineering project undertaken by the Brisbane Municipal Council in the 1880s.

The place is important in demonstrating the principal characteristics of a particular class of cultural places.

The Petrie Bight Retaining Wall is also a fine example of a late 19th century stone retaining wall, and is important in illustrating its type. It has aesthetic significance in the contribution of its scale and texture to the Brisbane riverscape, and the cast-iron work remains an example of the decorative work of important Brisbane ironfounders Smith Forrester & Co.

The place is important because of its aesthetic significance.

It has aesthetic significance in the contribution of its scale and texture to the Brisbane riverscape, and the cast-iron work remains an example of the decorative work of important Brisbane ironfounders Smith Forrester & Co.

The place has a special association with the life or work of a particular person, group or organisation of importance in Queensland's history.

The Petrie Bight Retaining Wall is important in illustrating the development of Brisbane's road and wharf facilities by the Brisbane Municipal Council in the late 19th century. Construction of the wall was associated closely with municipal acquisition of Kennedy Wharf, and reflects the Council's developing role in providing improved transportation facilities in Brisbane.
