= Norah Mary Potter =

Australian Sister of Mercy and school principal

Mother Norah Mary Potter RSM

Personal life
- Born: 1849 Longford, Ireland
- Died: November 13, 1927 Brisbane, Queensland, Australia
- Known for: Leadership of the Sisters of Mercy in Brisbane; development of All Hallows' School; expansion of Mercy hospitals and welfare institutions

Religious life
- Religion: Roman Catholic
- Order: Sisters of Mercy

Norah Mary Potter, R.S.M. (21 February 1849 – 13 November 1927), known in religion as Mother Mary Patrick, was an Irish-born Australian Sister of Mercy, educator, and long-serving Mother Superior of All Hallows’ Convent, Brisbane. Over nearly five decades, she played a pivotal role in the development of Catholic education, healthcare, and social welfare institutions in Queensland.

== Early life and vocation ==
Potter was born at Cloontamore, in the south of County Longford, Ireland, on 21 February 1849. She was the daughter of schoolmaster James Potter and his wife, Elizabeth (née Mulloolly), and educated at Cloontagh National School and Longford Convent School.

She entered the novitiate of the Sisters of Mercy at Athy in 1866 at the age of seventeen. While still a novice, she volunteered for the Australian mission and arrived in Queensland in 1868 to join the newly established Mercy community at All Hallows’ Convent in Brisbane.

== Leadership at All Hallows in Queensland ==
Potter was recognised early for her administrative talent and organisational skill. She made her profession of vows at All Hallows Convent in Brisbane in 1869. She became closely associated with All Hallows’ School, personally overseeing teaching, curriculum, discipline, and expansion. She was an advocate for women's education, and generations of students regarded her as a dedicated and influential presence whose interest in their welfare continued well beyond their school years.

Potter succeeded Mother Vincent Whitty and was elected to the administration of the Brisbane congregation of the Sisters of Mercy in 1879. She held the office of Mother Superior or assistant Superior for 48 years.

== Expansion of ministries ==
During her long tenure, Potter helped direct and inspire the broad development of Mercy initiatives throughout the Archdiocese of Brisbane. Under her leadership, the Sisters of Mercy established numerous convents and schools, hospitals for the sick, and institutions supporting the destitute and vulnerable.

Commentators and colleagues described her as combining spiritual zeal with practical wisdom, tact, and prudence, qualities that contributed significantly to the consolidation and expansion of Mercy institutions in Queensland.

Potter adopted Mother Vincent Whitty's idea of building a Mater Misericordiae Hospital in Brisbane, and she arranged the purchase of the South Brisbane land in 1893. Advances made under her leadership included extensions to Mater Public Hospital, and the establishment of a training school for lay nursing students. She had planned for a children's wing on the site before she died in 1927. The Mater Children's Hospital opened in 1931 and was dedicated to her memory.

== Death and legacy ==
Mother Mary Patrick died at All Hallows’ Convent on 13 November 1927 in her seventy-ninth year. Her obituary praised her “far-reaching influence” and the enduring institutions that stood as monuments to her life's work.

Potter died at All Hallows' Convent on 13 November 1927 in Brisbane, Queensland and was buried at Nudgee Cemetery & Crematorium. A requiem mass was celebrated at St Stephen's Cathedral by her brother Monsignor Michael Potter. A local newspaper noted her more than 65 years of religious service as well as describing her as a "business genius" whose legacy included the construction and management of the Mater Hospital. A fund was created by past pupils of the All Hallows Convent School in order to establish a memorial to the late Rev Mother Patrick.

She is remembered as one of the defining leaders of the Sisters of Mercy in Brisbane and a major figure in the development of Catholic education and charitable care in Queensland. A portrait of Mother Patrick by Oscar Friström hangs in All Hallows' Convent.
