= St Mary's College, Ipswich =

St Mary's College

Location
- Ipswich, Queensland; Australia; 27°36′33.5″S 152°45′18″E

Information
- Type: Catholic, secondary, private
- Motto: Latin: Deo Et Virtuti Fidelis ("Faithful to God and Integrity")
- Established: 1863; 163 years ago
- Sister school: St Edmund's College, Ipswich
- Oversight: Brisbane Catholic Education
- Principal: Alison Gilbert
- Grades: 7–12
- Gender: Girls
- Enrolment: ~730
- Campus: Woodend, Queensland
- Colours: Maroon, white & mercy blue
- Affiliation: Catholic Secondary Schoolgirls' Sports Association
- Website: www.stmarys.qld.edu.au

St Mary's College, (known colloquially as Marys), is an Australian Catholic secondary school for girls, located in Woodend, Ipswich, Queensland, Australia.The school accepts female students from Years 7 to 12, drawing from a wide area of Ipswich, Queensland. The total enrolment is approximately 730. The school is a member of the Catholic Secondary Schoolgirls' Sports Association.

== History ==
St Mary's School was established by Sisters of Mercy in 1863 as part of St Mary's Parish for the parish's primary-aged children. In 1913, St Mary's College was established as a separate secondary school exclusively for the higher education of girls in the Mercy tradition. The college and its pupils were then distinct from the primary school students. The Sisters of Mercy ceased administering and teaching at the school in the early 1990s. The college is owned by the Parish and is now administered and staffed by Brisbane Catholic Education. As of 2026, the principal is Alison Gilbert.

== Musical and drama productions ==
Each year, since 2007, a full musical production is conducted, in conjunction with St Edmund's College, Ipswich. The host school alternates every year.

- 2024 (SMC) - 'Mary Poppins the Broadway Musical'
- 2023 (SEC) – 'The Addams Family'
- 2022 (SMC) – ‘High School Musical – on Stage’
- 2021 (SEC) – 'School of Rock'
- 2019 (SMC) – 'Matilda the musical'
- 2018 (SEC) – 'Rock of Ages 101: High School Edition'
- 2017 (SMC) – 'Hairspray'
- 2016 (SEC) – 'The Wiz'
- 2015 (SMC) – 'Legally Blonde: The Musical'
- 2014 (SEC) – 'West Side Story'
- 2013 (SMC) – 'The Bells of St Mary's'
- 2012 (SEC) – '13'
- 2011 (SMC) – 'Fame'
- 2010 (SEC) – 'Footloose'
- 2009 (SMC) – 'High School Musical'
- 2008 (SEC) – 'Grease'
- 2007 (SMC) – 'Thoroughly Modern Millie'
- 2006 (SEC) – 'Beach Blanket Tempest'
- 2005 (SMC) – 'little Shop of Horrors'
- 2004 (SEC) – 'The Outsiders'
- 2003 (SMC) – 'Now and Then'
- 2002 (SEC) – 'Back to the 80s'
- 2001 (SMC) – 'Jesus Christ Superstar'
- 2000 (SEC) – 'Joseph and the Amazing Technicolour Dreamcoat'
- 1999 (SMC) – 'Open Season'
- 1998 (SEC) – 'SherWoodstock'
- 1997 (SMC) – 'Worlds Apart'
- 1996 (SEC) – 'Evita'
- 1995 (SMC) – 'Macbeth – The Rock Opera'
- 1994 (SEC) – 'Bye Bye Birdie'
- 1993 (SMC) – 'Half a Sixpence'
- 1992 (SEC) – 'The Pirates of Penzance'
- 1991 (SMC) – '¡Viva México! (El grito de Dolores)'
- 1990 (SEC) – 'Pippin'
- 1989 (SMC) – 'Oklahoma'

Students also participate and perform at various musical and drama evenings and lunch-time theatre and theatre sports groups.

=== Language ===
French is the LOTE (Language Other Than English) offered at the college. French is taught as a core subject for years 7-8, and may be undertaken as an elective subject for years 9-11 as of 2026. French has been taught at St Mary's College since 2023, and continues to grow a stronger base every year.

== School houses ==
St Mary's College has four houses: Gorry, Horan, Murphy and Whitty.

=== Houses ===
Name	Colour	Name origin
Gorry	Yellow/gold	Named after Jane Gorry, one of the Sisters of Mercy who Mother Vincent Whitty sent to create the school.
Horan	Red	Named after Father Andrew Horan who came to Ipswich in 1875. He was originally meant to fill in at the school's church for Father Brun but ended up staying the rest of his life.
Murphy	Green	Named after Sister Mary Joseph (Bridget) Murphy who worked at the school. With her Irish heritage the house colour is green.
Whitty	Blue	Named after Mother Vincent Whitty who came out from Ireland in 1861. She sent some Mercy Sisters out to establish the school.

== Notable alumnae ==
- Annastacia Palaszczuk, Queensland premier (2015–2023)
