= Robert Whitty =

Irish Jesuit priest

Robert Whitty (7 January 1817 – 1 September 1895) was an Irish Jesuit priest.

== Biography ==
Born at Pouldarrig, near Oylegate, Whitty entered Maynooth College in his fourteenth year. Having added two years on the Dumboyne Establishment to his college course, he was still too young for ordination. He offered his services to Thomas Griffiths, the Vicar Apostolic of the London District, who ordained him priest at St. Edmund's, Ware, 19 September 1840.

From the first he showed a warm sympathy with the Oxford converts and formed a friendship with John Henry Newman and Frederick Oakeley before they had become Catholics. Nicholas Patrick Wiseman showed his appreciation of his priestly zeal by making him provost of the newly appointed metropolitan chapter and his vicar-general in 1850.

In this capacity he was responsible for the publication of the pastoral "From the Flaminian Gate". Whitty recounted some English readers taking the publication as a form of Catholic aggression; "The Cardinal never blamed me", Whitty wrote long afterwards, "but others did."

In 1857, Whitty obtained leave to resign his position, and entered the noviceship of the Society of Jesus at Verona. On his return to England he was appointed professor of canon law in St. Beunos College in North Wales. After labouring for some time in Scotland, he was appointed provincial. Subsequently, he was assistant to Anthony Maria Anderledy, the Jesuit Father-General.

Whitty filled other important offices, and worked until the end, giving ecclesiastical retreats even in the last summer of his life. He died at the age of 78 years, of which he had spent 38 as a Jesuit.

Whitty was brother to Ellen Whitty.
