= Petrie Bight =

Bight of the Brisbane River in Australia

Coordinates: 27.466°S 153.032°E

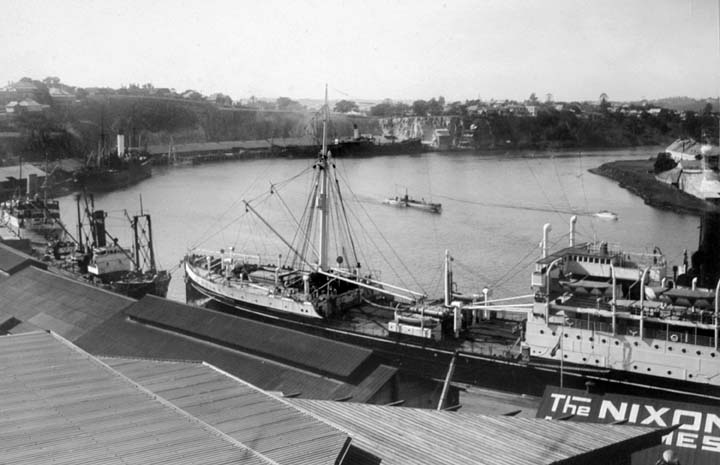
Petrie Bight (prior to the construction of the Story Bridge), June 1927

Petrie Bight is a reach of the Brisbane River in Brisbane, Queensland, Australia. The land to the north of the bight, centred on the area under the Story Bridge's northern point and around the Brisbane River to Customs House is also known as Petrie Bight and was formerly a suburb of Brisbane. The area whilst still informally known as Petrie Bight, was absorbed into the suburbs of the Brisbane CBD and Fortitude Valley during consolidation of suburbs by the Brisbane City Council. With a resurgence in Brisbane residents interested in this part of the city and its history, has meant there is a possibility the Brisbane City Council and Queensland Government may once again reinstate Petrie Bight as a suburb to give the area a better sense of identity.

However, land to the south of the reach Petrie Bight does not use that name, and is known by its suburb name of Kangaroo Point. Today, it is overpassed by the Story Bridge (Bradfield Highway), and underpassed by the Clem Jones Tunnel toll road.

== Geography ==
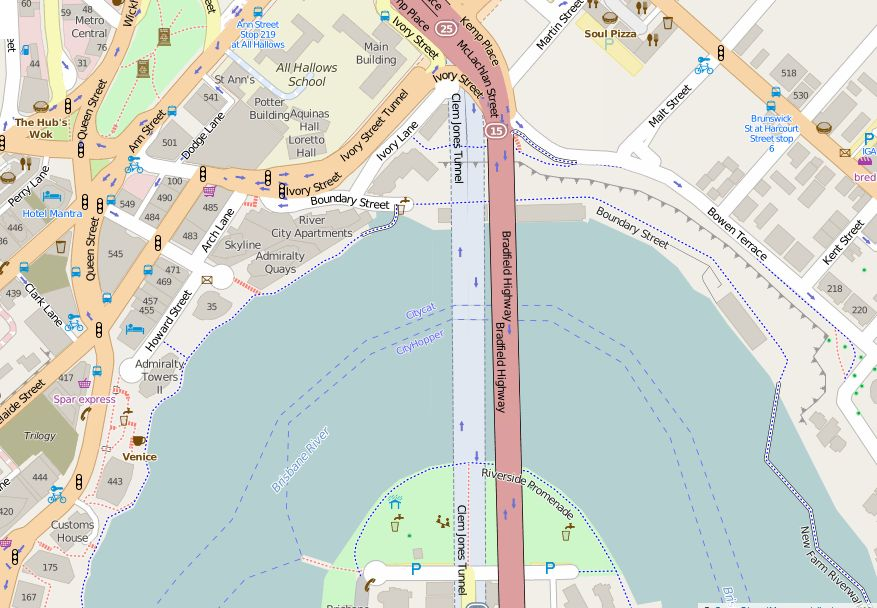
OpenStreetMap – Petrie Bight, 2015

Petrie Bight is a sharp curve in the Brisbane River at the northern ends of the Town Reach (upstream) and the Shafston Reach (downstream) around the tip of Kangaroo Point.

The area was named after Andrew Petrie, who was the Superintendent of Works of the Moreton Bay Penal Colony and first free settler of Brisbane. Andrew Petrie in 1837 established his workshop and residence at the corner of Wharf and Queen Streets.

== History ==
The land formed by the sharp bend in the Brisbane River around which the CBD is now located was known to the Turrbal people as Meeanjin in the Turrbal language, and this name has more recently been used as the traditional name for Brisbane more generally, as well as its traditional owners and custodians.

The location was known to white settlers as Petrie Gardens and was the location of an early settlement farm, one of two that provided food for the colony.

In 1837 Andrew Petrie who had been living in the Female Factory since his arrival to the penal settlement, selected a site on the bend of the river and constructed his residence. Andrew Petrie also established the prominent Petrie construction business here in 1840. The Petrie construction firm, which were the first architects and builders in Queensland, had their large yard and workshops adjacent to Andrew Petrie's house. Later, the Petrie business constructed a new two-storey office still within the suburb of Petrie Bight at the corner of Adelaide and Queen Streets. This building was demolished by the Brisbane City Council in the 1930s to widen the intersection due to traffic congestion in the city.

Petrie Bight has been the base for water police and in earlier times wharves. The location of Customs House and the preference for wharves was due to site being directly downstream from the central business district.

Surveyor Henry Wade, on his 1844 Map of the Environs of Brisbane Town, identified the Petrie's Bight area south of Boundary Street and east of Queen Street as "Reserved for Dry Dock". Surveyor Galloway did the same on his 1856 Plan of the Suggested Extension of the Town of Brisbane. At this time the surrounding area was sparsely occupied, with Andrew Petrie's house and factory at the corner of Wharf and Queen Streets; Dr Hobbs' house (now St John's Deanery) a little further north in Adelaide Street; the original Customs House in Queen Street, beside the Brisbane River; and a ferry jetty just north of the Customs Houses.

A c. 1860 map of Brisbane Town showing the new town boundaries no longer labelled Petrie's Bight as a reserve for a dry dock (no dry dock was ever established there), but the site remained unsurveyed Government land. An early track (the northern end of Queen Street) ran through this land, branching off in three directions to New Farm, Fortitude Valley and the northwest end of Spring Hollow.

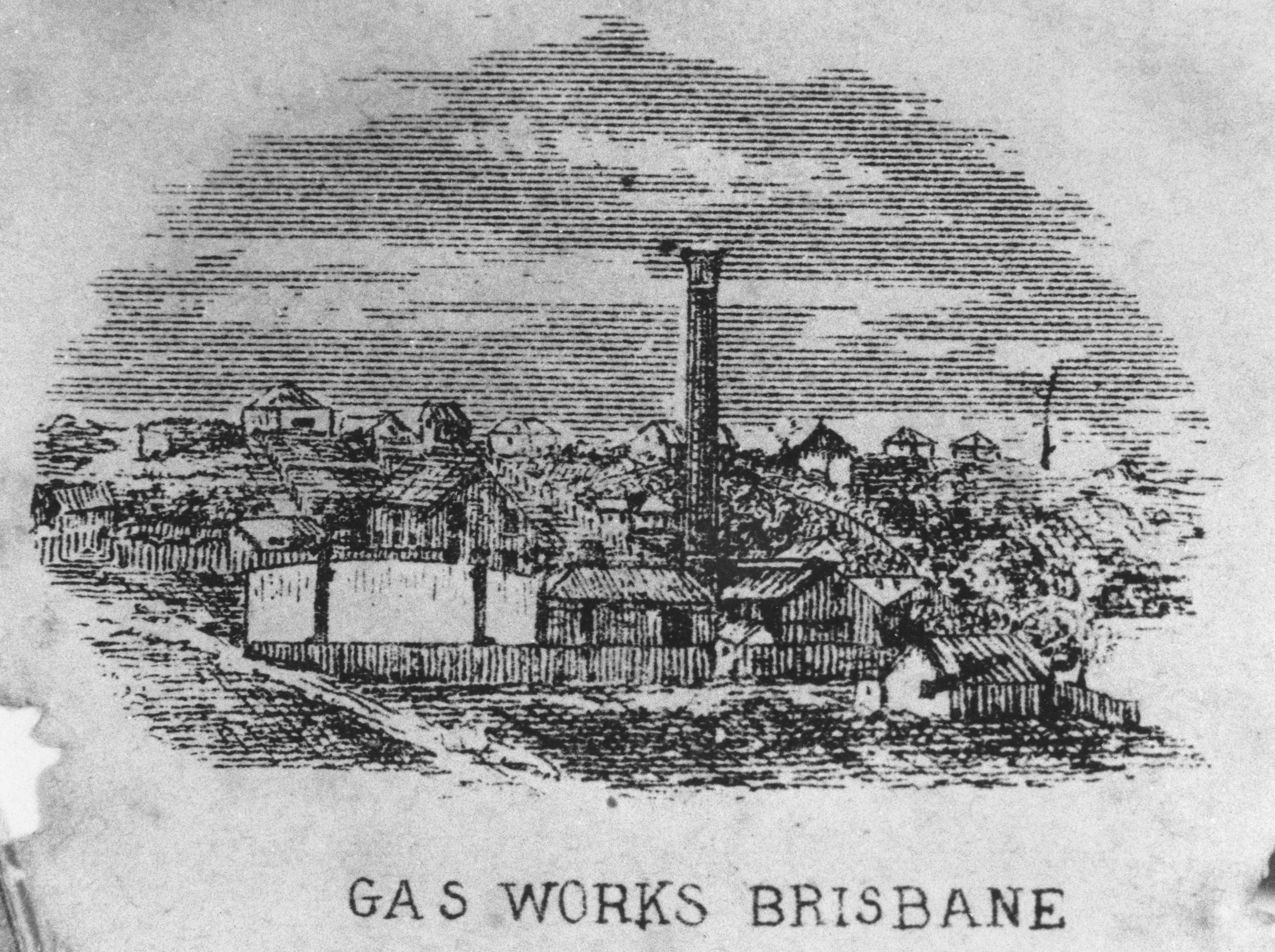
Engraving of the Brisbane Gas Company's gasworks, Petrie Bight, circa 1868

Under the provisions of the Brisbane Gas Company Bill 1864 the Queensland Government granted to the company a site bounded by what are now Ann, Boundary and Macrossan streets and a 160-metre frontage to the Brisbane River, as the site for Brisbane's first gas works. This was the northern half of the Government land at Petrie's Bight. Gas production commenced there in 1865, providing the Brisbane Municipal Council with a regular supply of gas for street lighting. By the early 1870s the demand for gas for domestic consumption was outstripping supply, and in the mid-1870s a second gasometer was constructed on the site. In 1873 the Brisbane Gas Company gained a formal deed of grant to the Petrie's Bight land, an area of 4 acres 17.5 perches (1.66ha), which the company had purchased from the Government in May 1873 for £4,300.

An April 1873 a survey plan titled Survey of Site of Gas Works and Adjacent Crown Land Shewing Road Through Same indicates that by this date the gas works site was fenced along the entire length of its land boundaries, but that through this the government had just surveyed a 20 feet wide road between Macrossan and Boundary streets, which later became an extension of Adelaide Street. Photographs from the 1860s and early 1870s show a tall paling fence around the perimeter of the gas works, prohibiting public access. Early Brisbane resident Victor Drury, writing in The Courier-Mail in 1939, recalled: "When Adelaide Street was extended to Boundary Street, there were turnstiles there, and only pedestrians could use the path as a short cut to Queen Street."

=== River wharfage ===
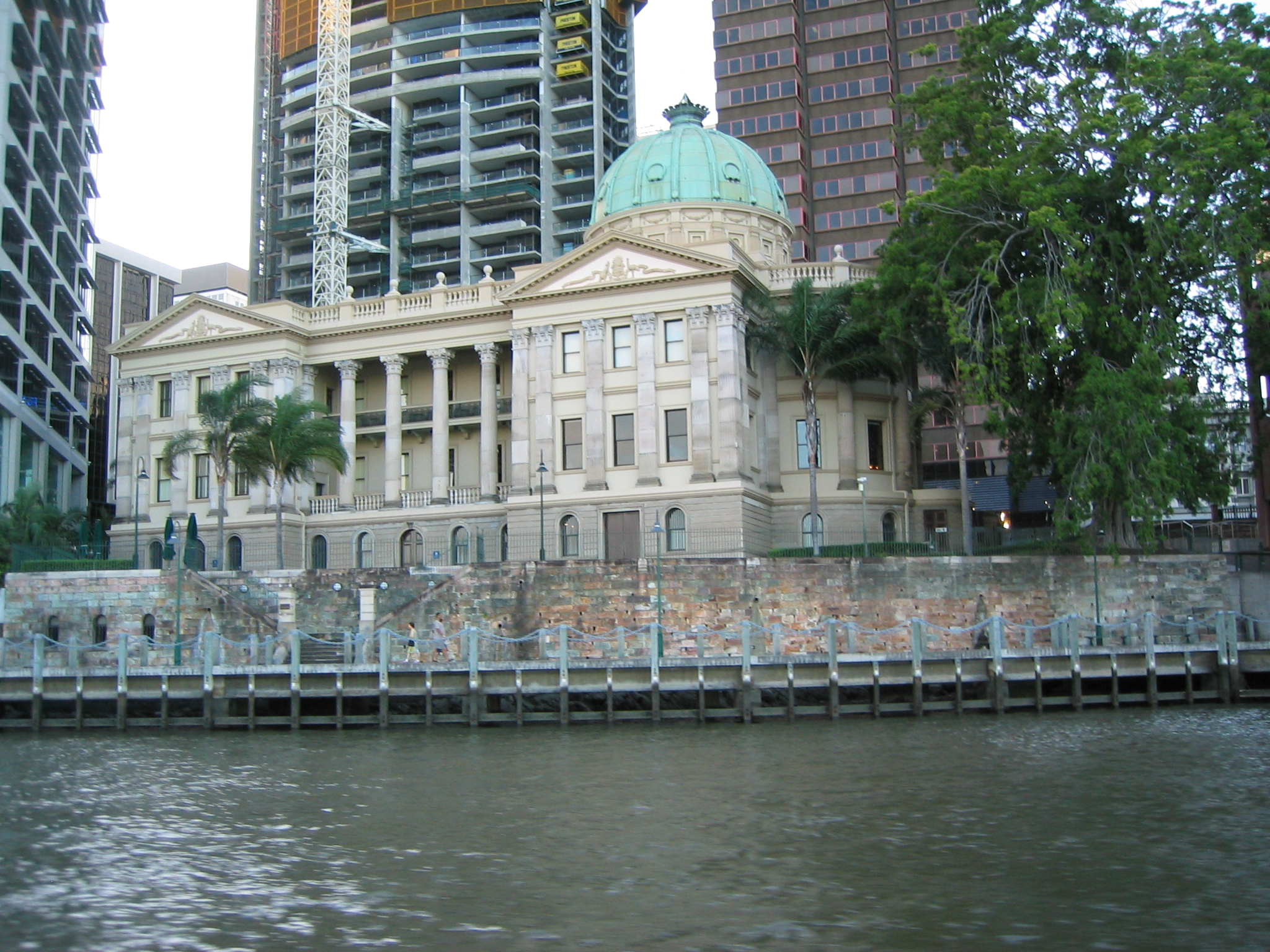
Customs House, Brisbane, as seen from Petrie Bight, 2005

In the early 1840s wharfage in Brisbane was concentrated along the South Brisbane Reach of the Brisbane River, but within a decade had extended to the Town Reach further downstream, which soon rivalled South Brisbane in terms of shipping activity. An 1849 decision to locate Brisbane's first purpose-built Customs House at the northern end of the Town Reach acted as the impetus for the development of wharves on this part of the river. The Commissariat Store below William Street, which had served as Brisbane's first customs facility, was replaced in 1850 by a new customs building on the site of the present Customs House in Queen Street, at Petrie's Bight. (This in turn was replaced in 1886–89 by the current building.) During the 1850s and 1860s, a number of shipping companies and private investors constructed wharves and warehouses between the Customs House and Alice Street, near the City Botanic Gardens.

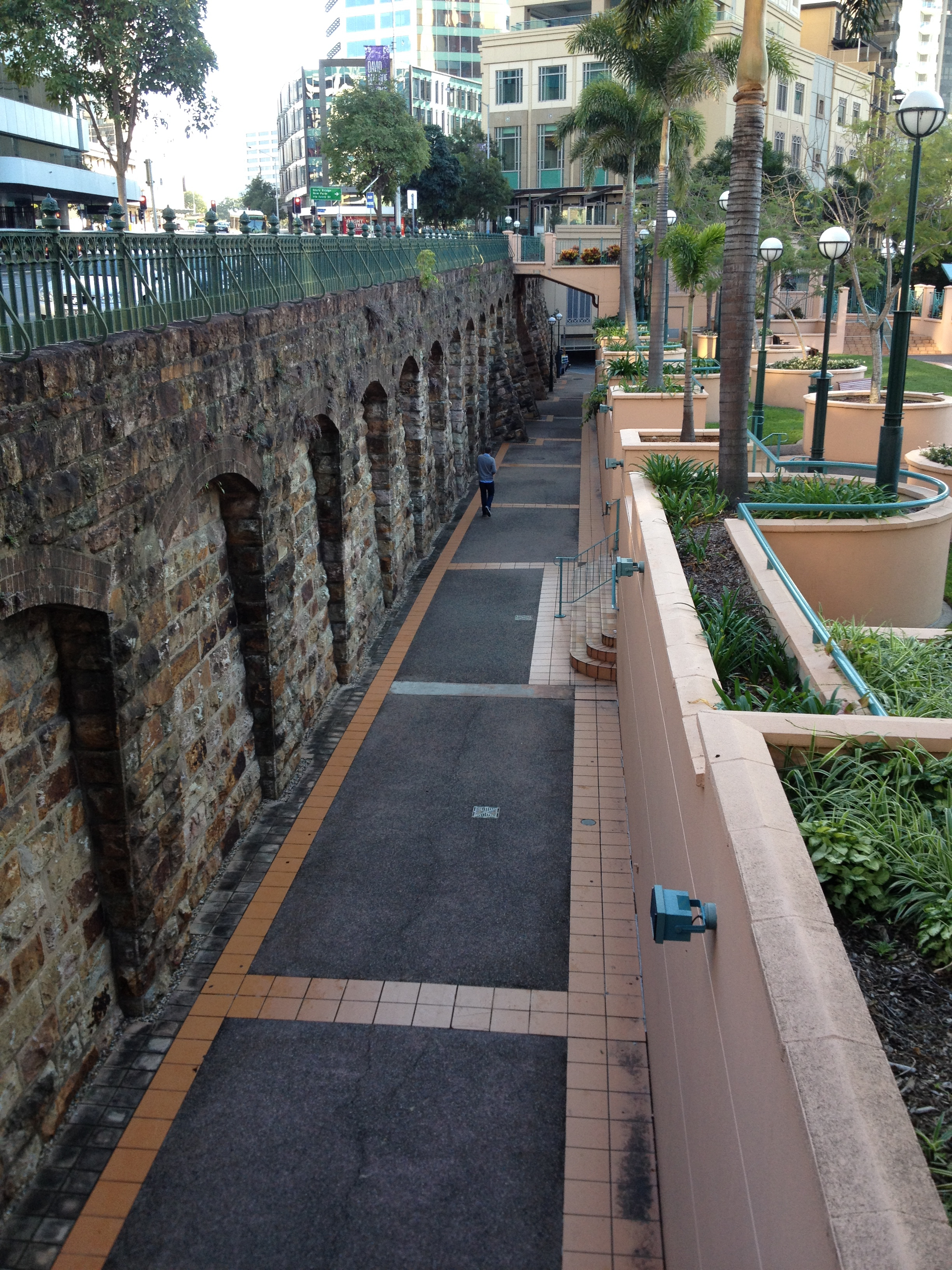
Petrie Bight retaining wall, 2014

Construction of a Government wharf (Kennedy Wharf) at Petrie's Bight north of the Customs House commenced in 1875 was completed in 1877 and was leased to private shipping firms. In 1880 the Brisbane Municipal Council acquired the wharf and immediately extended it northward, creating the (now heritage-listed) Petrie Bight retaining wall between the wharf and Queen Street. In 1884 the council also constructed a wharf at the end of Boundary Street, and in the mid-1880s William Collin established his own wharf at Petrie's Bight, just downstream from the council's Boundary Street wharf. Purchase of land from the Brisbane Gas Company in 1902 gave the Council control of the river frontage from the Customs House to Boundary Street, and between 1913 and 1916 the Council constructed reinforced concrete wharves between Macrossan and Boundary Streets, and between Kennedy Wharf and the Customs House. The whole of the council's wharfage at Petrie's Bight was subsequently renamed Circular Quay Wharves.

Between 1900 and 1912 Brisbane Wharves Ltd established wharves at Petrie's Bight from Boundary Street to Bowen Terrace, rivalling the council's Circular Quay facilities in importance. Principal investors in the Brisbane Wharf Company were Howard Smith and William Collin and Sons. From the late 1890s, Howard Smith and Company Ltd occupied the council's Boundary Street Wharf at Petrie's Bight and in the early years of the 20th century leased the adjacent new wharves constructed by Brisbane Wharves Limited at the base of the New Farm cliffs, below Bowen Terrace. These wharves were extended in the 1920s, and in the 1930s were resumed by the Queensland government for the construction of the Story Bridge.

In the early 20th century the roads to Petrie's Bight were improved significantly by the Brisbane City Council, providing an important impetus for the construction of new warehouses in the Upper Adelaide Street area. From 1923 to 1928 the Brisbane City Council implemented its most ambitious town improvement scheme to that date: the widening of Adelaide Street by 14 feet along its entire length. Resumptions in Adelaide Street had commenced in the 1910s, but work on the street widening did not take place until the 1920s. The work was undertaken in stages, commencing in 1923 at the southern end where the new Brisbane City Hall was under construction. Some buildings had the front section removed and a contemporary facade installed on the new road alignment. Elsewhere, earlier buildings were demolished and substantial new structures took their place. At the northern end of Adelaide Street the cutting down of the hill below St John's Cathedral in 1928 facilitated greater access to Petrie Bight, which, close to new city wharves at the end of Boundary Street, boomed in the 1920s as a warehousing district.

By 1921 Queensland was poised to resume the economic boom interrupted by the First World War (1914–18). In the period 1922–1928, Queensland experienced its first and last economic boom between the outbreak of war in 1914 and the 1950s. The benefits of the boom economy were reflected throughout the State, but nowhere more so than in Brisbane, with 29% of the Queensland population in December 1924. In physical terms the boom was expressed in a spate of building activity that transported the central business district of Brisbane into the 20th century, shedding its late Victorian image.

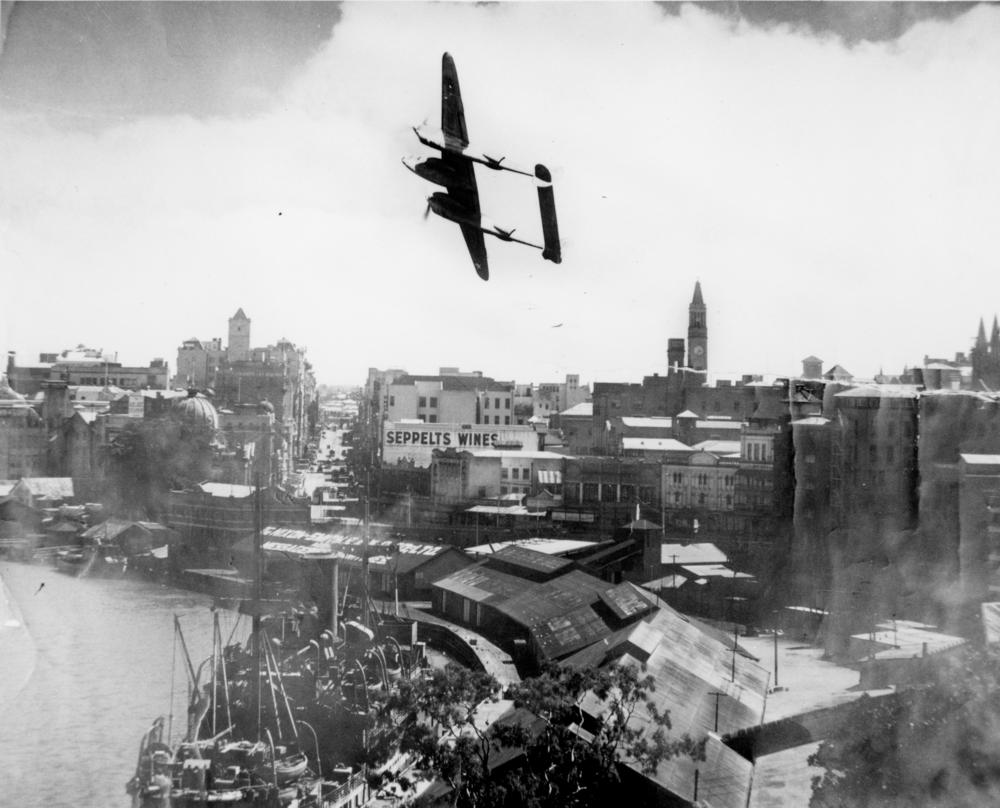
Wharves, c. 1943

The take-off in the building industry was evident during 1922–23, reflected in an active central business district real estate market, and prompting the Brisbane City Council to re-assess central city rateable values in 1923. By September 1925 property in Queen Street, the principal retail and financial street of Brisbane, could be acquired only at highly inflated prices, forcing investors into more peripheral locations such as Petrie's Bight. A fall in the price of building materials, combined with the trend in using concrete, a more economical product than brick, for large construction projects, further stimulated building activity.

The area of Circular Quay Wharves was later referred to as Admiralty Wharf. These wharfs were redeveloped into Brisbane City's first substantial high-rise residential towers between 1988 and 1995, now known as Admiralty Towers.
