= Customs House, Brisbane =

Heritage-listed house in Brisbane, Queensland

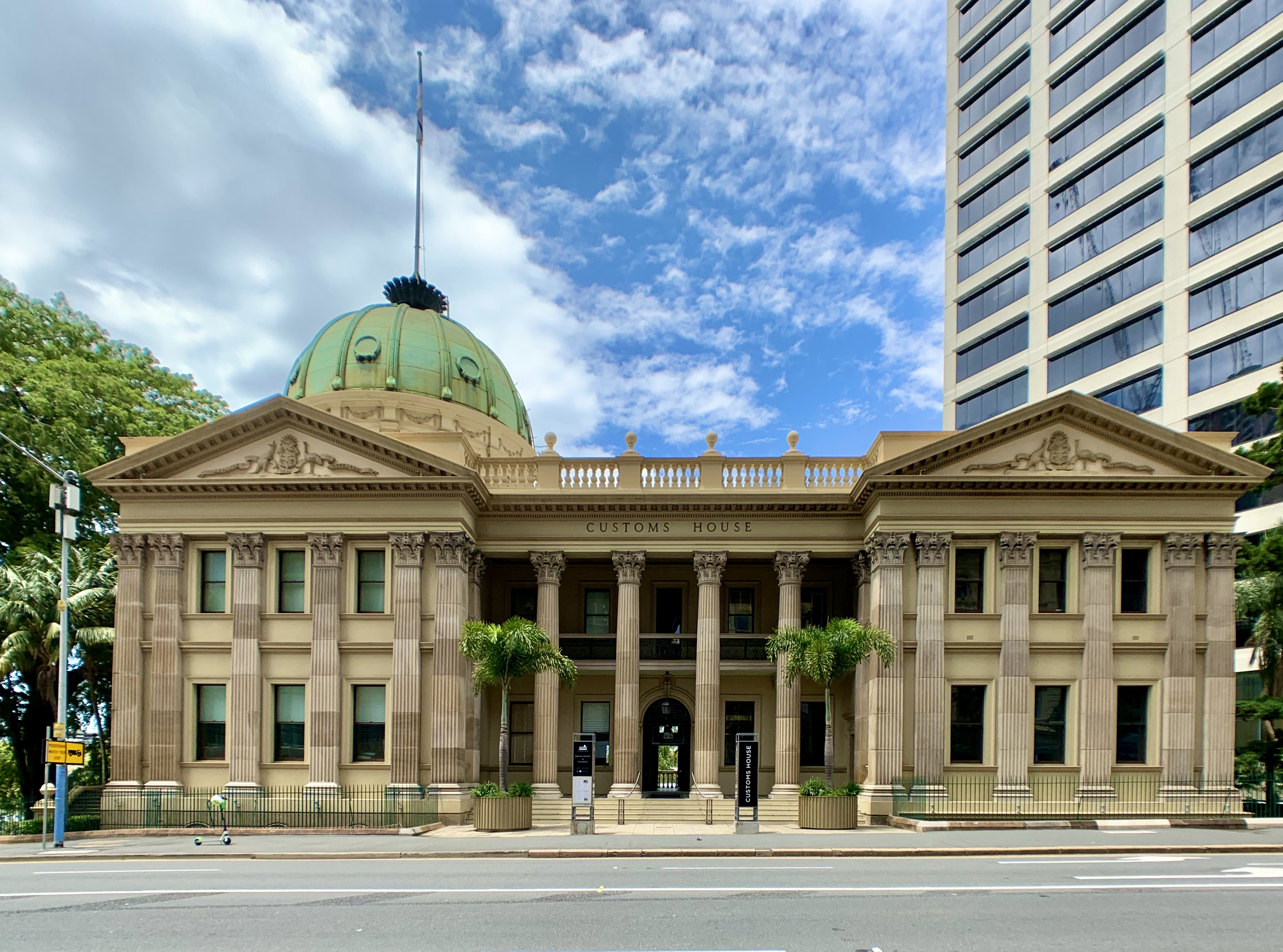
- Old Customs House, Brisbane at dusk

- Location within Queensland
- 27.4654°S 153.0311°E
- Location: 427 Queen Street, Brisbane City, Brisbane, Queensland, Australia

History
- Design period: 1870s–1890s (late 19th century)
- Built: 1886–1889
- Built for: Government of Queensland

Site notes
- Architect: Charles H McLay of the Queensland Colonial Architect's Office
- Architectural style: Victorian Free Classical

Queensland Heritage Register
- Official name: Brisbane Customs House (former)
- Type: State Heritage (built)
- Designated: 7 February 2005
- Reference no.: 600156
- Significant period: 1880s (fabric); 1880s–1980s (historical)
- Significant components: dome, toilet block/earth closet/water closet, trees/plantings, wall/s – retaining, steps/stairway
- Builders: John Petrie & Son

Customs House is a heritage-listed customs house at 427 Queen Street, Brisbane CBD, Brisbane, Queensland, Australia. It was designed by Charles H McLay and built from 1886 to 1889 at a cost of £38,346 by John Petrie & Son. It was originally used for the collection of customs duty and was opened in 1889 when Queensland was a British colony, replacing the original Customs House located at Petrie Bight. It was added to the Queensland Heritage Register on 7 February 2005.

The collection of custom duties on imported products was particularly important to Queensland where the manufacturing sector was slow to develop. Brisbane was declared a port city in 1846. In 1908, seven years after federation, the building was acquired by the federal government.

Customs House is within reach of the CityCat catamaran ferry service, as well as the Free Loop Bus.

== History ==
The Brisbane Customs House was erected at the northern end of the Town Reach of the Brisbane River, near Petrie's Bight, between 1886 and 1889 to a design prepared by Charles McLay of the Queensland Colonial Architect's Office.

The 1880s building replaced an earlier and much smaller customs house on the site. The location had been chosen in 1849 following the declaration of Moreton Bay as a port of entry in 1846 and after considerable discussion as to the most suitable location for a customs house. At the time shipping activity was centred on the South Brisbane Reach and the decision to locate a customs house at the northern end of the Town Reach acted as an impetus for the development of wharves along this part of the river. A small building was erected for customs purposes in 1850 and in the following decades became increasingly inadequate as Brisbane emerged as the principal commercial centre and port of Queensland.

In 1884 the Queensland Government decided to construct a new customs house. In March 1886 a design by Charles McLay was selected from many proposals in the Colonial Architect's Office for a new Brisbane Customs House. McLay completed the specification in May 1886 and construction commenced in September that year.

Charles McLay was the major designer under the colonial architect George Connolly and was appointed Chief Draftsman in 1889. His works include the Bundaberg Post Office, probably the Fortitude Post Office and the Lady Norman Wing Brisbane Children's Hospital (with John James Clark), of which the Brisbane Customs House is by far the most ambitious and prominent design.

The contract was let to one of Brisbane's oldest and most respected contractors, John Petrie & Son, who tendered with a price of £37,342. The contract time was 30 months but because of difficulties with the supply of some materials, especially stone for the foundations, and alterations to the original plans, the building took longer than anticipated to complete and it was opened on 2 September 1889. Retaining walls, fencing, a double staircase down to the river and nearby earth closets were also constructed.

The completed building in the Victorian Free Classical style incorporated pedimented gables and a massive colonnade. The copper-sheathed dome was constructed by sub-contracted coppersmith and brass founder, William Smith Henderson, of Perry Street, Petries' Bight. Heraldic scenes in the pediments were precursors to the official Queensland coat of arms, which was not granted until 1893. A curved iron balustrade to the balconies included the royal cypher of the reigning sovereign, Queen Victoria, in the cast. Red cedar was used extensively for desks, counters, cabinets and tables as well as for a massive and elegant staircase.

The Brisbane Customs House was built during a period of economic prosperity and a construction "boom" in Queensland and was amongst the more impressive of a number of notable public and commercial buildings erected in Brisbane during the 1880s, which included the first stage of the Treasury Building (1886–1889). Public pride in the new customs house was considerable. On 7 September 1889, a few days after the building was opened for business, the local Brisbane Courier newspaper drew attention to "the handsome and imposing appearance, especially as seen from the river or from Petrie's Bight" and predicted that the Brisbane Customs House with its tall columns, pilasters and large copper-sheathed dome would "become one of the features of the city".

In 1891 stables, additional retaining walls and fencing, and more earth closets were erected at a cost of £446. By the mid-1890s gardens and a driveway had been developed. The mature fig tree now at the site was possibly planted about this time. Minor repairs were carried out throughout the 1890s, including some work in 1895 after 7 feet (2.1 m) of water inundated the basement during the 1893 Brisbane River floods.

As a consequence of the Federation of Australia, the Brisbane Customs House, valued at £80,804 (£40,804 for the structure and £40,000 for the site), was transferred to the Australian Government by December 1908.

In 1906 the inadequacies of the original flat roof were overcome by the installation of a new hipped roof. Rearrangement of counters and partitions in the Long Room was carried out in 1911 and again in 1919. Frequently minor repairs, cleaning and maintenance work was carried out to the interior of the building in succeeding decades. In 1947 major internal alterations were undertaken: all but two of the internal masonry walls were demolished; the timber floors were replaced by concrete slabs; the cedar staircase was removed and a new terrazzo one was installed at another location; mezzanine floors were erected in the Long Room; and the roof was replaced - without the original chimneys. In 1978 part of the exterior was cleaned, repaired and sealed and painted.

In the mid-1980s the Australian Customs Department moved out of the building to Australia House. The building became redundant when port facilities moved to the Port of Brisbane at the mouth of the Brisbane River, resulting in its closure in April 1988.

The building remained vacant from 1988 until leased by the University of Queensland. The university refurbished the building from 1991 to 1994 at a cost of A$7.5 million. At this period some of the interior masonry walls that had been removed in 1947 were replaced and the original timber stair was reconstructed. Non-significant partitions added after 1948 and parts of the 1940s fit out were removed except for some good quality intact 1940s office cabinetry which survived and part of the 1940s main stair which provided access to the basement. Two of the 1940s galleries added to the Long Room were removed and one, at the southwest end, retained and adapted. Timber window and door joinery was conserved and plaster mouldings reconstructed where they were missing.

Following the renovation, there is a restaurant and function centre within the building, and regular concerts and an art gallery occupies the lower floor. The Long Room was once the place customs business was transacted. Today the room is used various events, such as lectures and dinners.

In October 2015, it was announced that a 47-storey tower block would be built adjacent to the Customs House. Protests erupted over concerns that the tower would be too close to the Customs House causing over-shadowing and the likely destruction of the fig tree. University of Queensland announced it would lodge a legal challenge against the approval of the project by Brisbane City Council, stating that the tower would be only 2.6 metres (8 ft 6 in) from the Customs House boundary, despite the council's own provisions in the City Plan 2014, which would require a 25 metres (82 ft) setback. However, the university lost its court case in July 2016. In November 2016, the university reached agreement with the tower's designers to alter the tower's profile to preserve views, reduce external car parking and restrictions on the pruning of the fig tree.

== Description ==
Construction was finished in three years at a cost of £38,346. The downstream end of the Brisbane central business district was selected to spur the development of wharves in the precinct known as Petrie Bight. The lower floor contained a secure warehouse where goods not having been passed customs were stored.

Customs House is a Brisbane landmark known for its distinctive copper dome. The building was designed by Charles McLay of the Queensland Colonial Architect's Office. Despite no government in the country having a coat of arms at the time, the building features a depiction on its facade of a shield between an emu and kangaroo. An iron balustrade was shipped from England with the royal cypher VR for "Victoria Regina" wrought on it in honour of Queen Victoria. Inside the structure features black and white marble with cedar fittings.

The Brisbane Customs House, located at the northern end of Queen Street and beside the Brisbane River at the northern end of the Town Reach, is an imposing two-storeyed rendered brick building in the classical style. The site is prominent due to the proximity to the river, the bend in Queen Street and the general topography which opens up many views to and from the building. A prominent feature is the large copper dome at the semi-circular northern end which is a focal point viewed from both directions along Queen Street and from the river for ships arriving from Moreton Bay. The architectural form of the building announces the northern edge of the city centre and is sympathetic to the landscape features of cliffs and river bends.

The architectural form clearly demonstrates the intended purpose of the building with the double entrance from both the city and the river, which is a response to the siting of the building between the river and the town. The riverside setting allows long views across and along the river to the building.

Other features of the Brisbane Customs House which demonstrate its former use are more characteristic of late 19th century customs houses in Australia, especially the general design and planning arrangement of the building to include an imposing masonry facade, an impressive public space (the former Long Room now used for functions), a secure bonded warehouse (the former Queens Warehouse, now converted to an art gallery), offices and a secure boundary fence. The Brisbane Customs House is a well proportioned and skilfully designed example of a Victorian building in the Renaissance mode executed to take best advantage of its dominant site and solve the practical problems of dual access from the town and from the river. It has considerable unity in its scale, form and use of materials.

The main structure of the building is of brick on a stone foundation. The columns, pilasters, balusters to the colonnade, the parapet and side entrances are of Murphy's Creek sandstone. There are cast iron balustrades on the recessed verandahs and external stairs. The main roof is clad with corrugated iron. Timber window and door joinery survives reasonably intact on the exterior walls.

The exterior of the building is very intact except for the loss of the original roof, which was replaced by the present steel trussed roof in the 1940s, the removal of chimneys and the widening of the northwestern end of the balconies in the 1940s.

The interior fabric is less intact due to the alterations and additions carried out during its use as a customs house and to the most recent refurbishment, which removed much of the 1940s fabric but recovered aspects of the 19th century form, including reconstruction of the original timber staircase.

Inside the building the most imposing space is that of the Long Room beneath the dome. Fluted Corinthian pilasters of painted plaster are below the coffered ceiling of the dome, which has a central glazed section. In the basement some of the original walls with arched openings remain. The 1890–91 Moggill sandstone retaining wall carries around the perimeter of the site reasonably intact and incorporates a wrought iron balustrade, masonry piers, stairs and rooms for the former underground privies at the river's edge. There is a small ground with a mature fig tree and sunken garden, which contribute to the building's riverside setting.

The view from the river and the secure wharf area has been compromised by the riverside walkway.

== Gallery ==
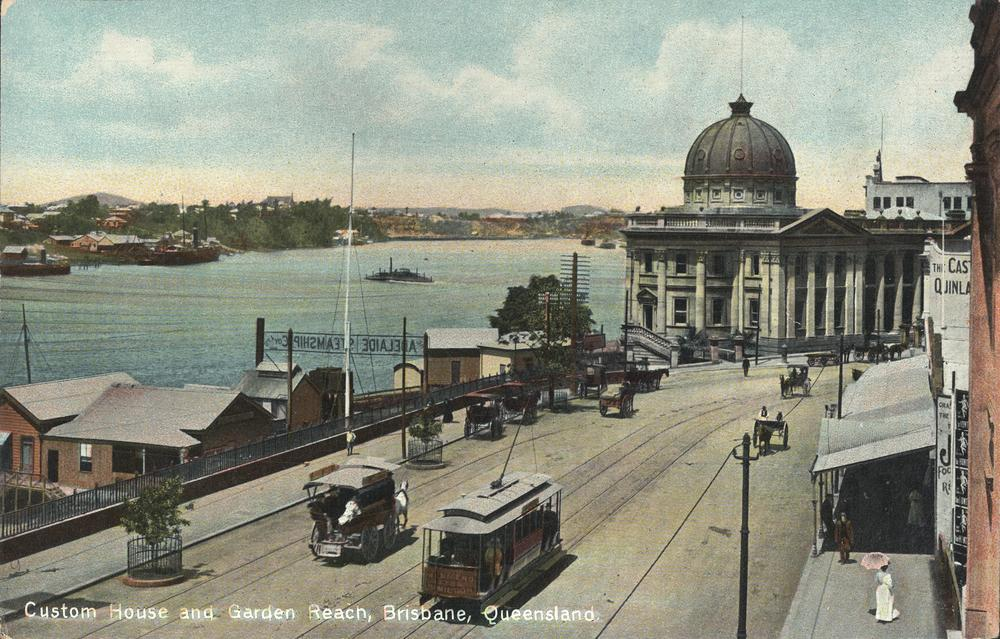
Customs House, Brisbane, ca. 1906

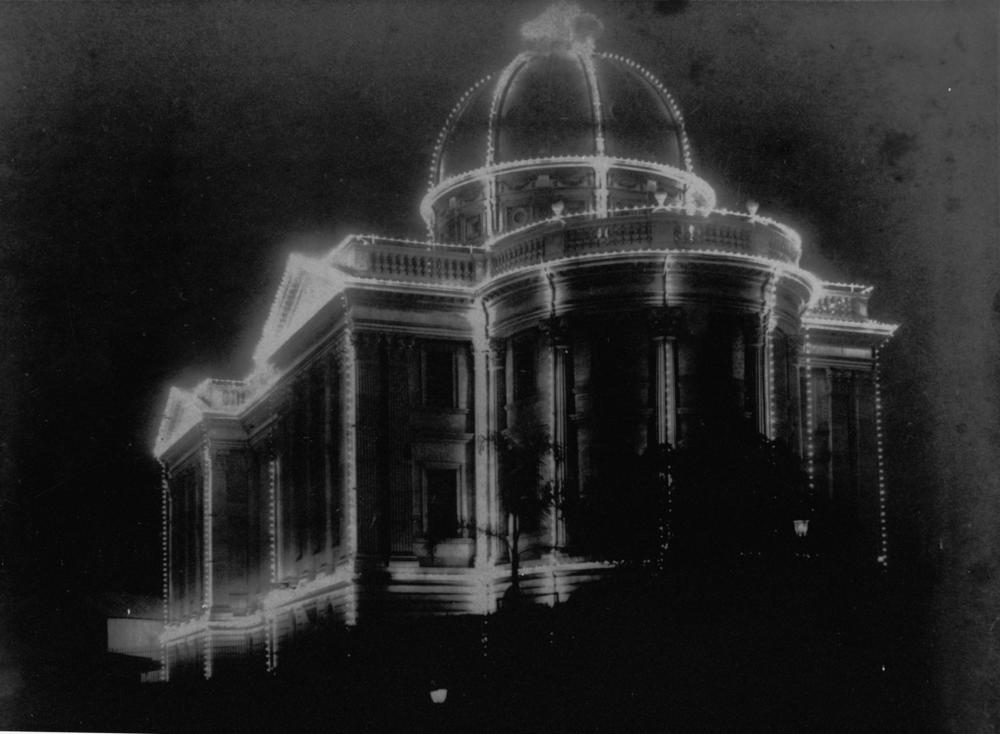
Customs House illuminated for the Duke of York's visit to Brisbane in 1901

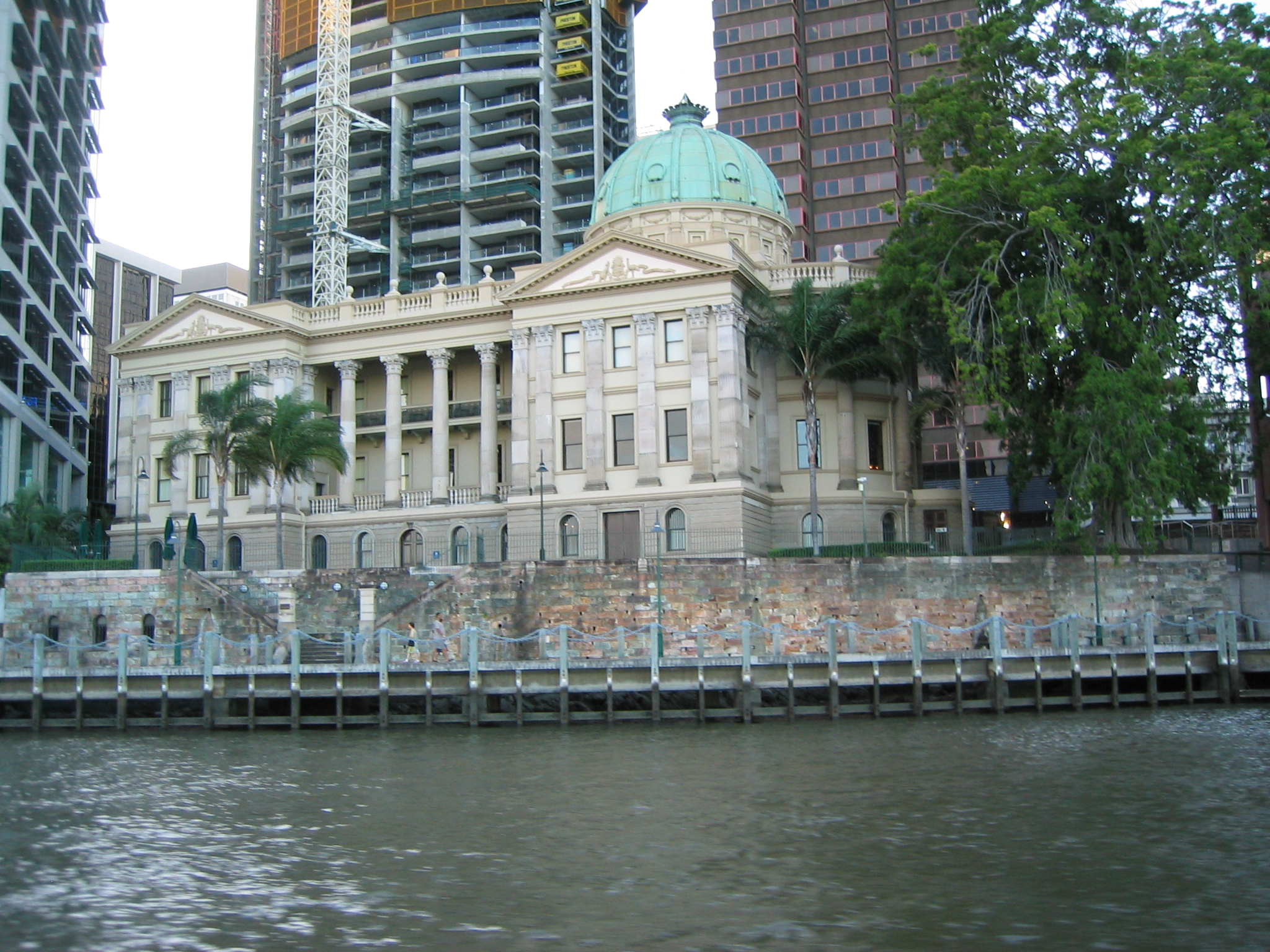
Customs House from the Brisbane River

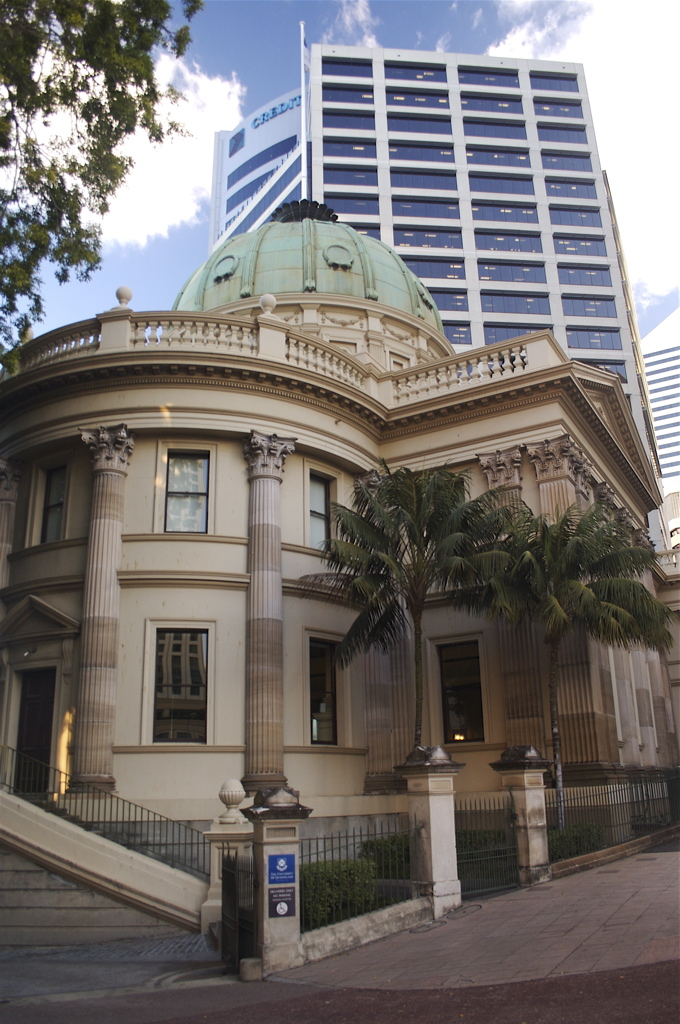
Street view looking south

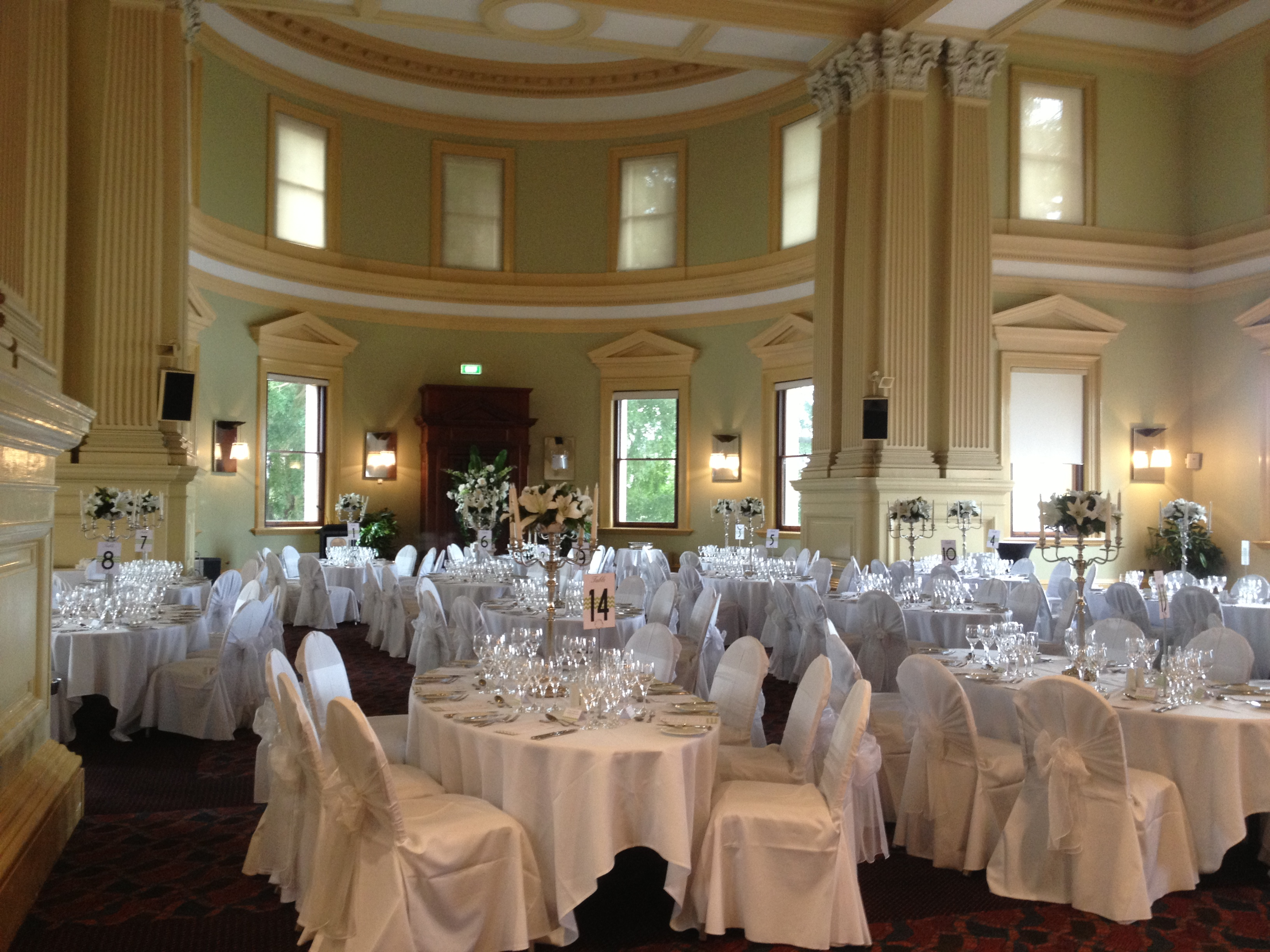
Interior of Customs House, Brisbane set up for a wedding reception

== Heritage listing ==
The former Brisbane Customs House was listed on the Queensland Heritage Register on 7 February 2005 having satisfied the following criteria.

The place is important in demonstrating the evolution or pattern of Queensland's history.

The former Brisbane Customs House, constructed between 1886 and 1889 to a design prepared by Charles McLay of the Queensland Colonial Architect's Office, was in use by the customs service for nearly a century. It is important historically as an expression of the importance of the customs service to Queensland and to Australia and for its site, which relates to the establishment of Brisbane as a port of entry and the development of major wharfage along the Town Reach of the Brisbane River and Petrie's Bight. The Brisbane Customs House was built during a period of economic prosperity and a construction "boom" in Queensland and was amongst the more impressive of a number of notable public and commercial buildings erected in Brisbane during the 1880s. It is important in demonstrating part of the pattern of Queensland's history.

The place is important in demonstrating the principal characteristics of a particular class of cultural places.

The former Brisbane Customs House is important in demonstrating the principal characteristics of its class of cultural places: late 19th century masonry customs houses. These characteristics include: the imposing form; general arrangement of spaces to include Long Room, Bond Store and offices; and secure fencing. It is a fine example of the work of architect Charles McLay and a good example of one of a series of customs houses designed in the Queensland Colonial Architect's office and of the work of contractor John Petrie.

The place is important because of its aesthetic significance.

The Brisbane Customs House has aesthetic value as a well proportioned and skilfully designed Victorian building in the Renaissance mode, executed to take best advantage of its dominant site and solve the practical problems of dual access from the town and from the river. It has considerable unity in its scale, form and use of materials. With its copper dome and two storey colonnade it makes an imposing and important contribution the streetscape and to the townscape. Its location on the riverbank adds to its aesthetic values, allowing distant views from along and across the river.

The place has a strong or special association with a particular community or cultural group for social, cultural or spiritual reasons.

The place has strong associations for the Brisbane community as a landmark and as a rare surviving marker of the Port of Brisbane before it moved to the mouth of the river.

The place has a special association with the life or work of a particular person, group or organisation of importance in Queensland's history.

It has a special association with the Australian Customs Service, which occupied the building for nearly 100 years.
