= All Hallows' School =

Catholic day school for girls in Brisbane, Australia

Location
- 547 Ann Street; Brisbane, Queensland, 4000; Australia; 27°27′38″S 153°2′1″E

Information
- Type: Private, single-sex, day school
- Motto: French: Dieu et Devoir (God and Duty)
- Denomination: Roman Catholic, Sisters of Mercy
- Established: 1861; 165 years ago
- Principal: Catherine O'Kane
- Teaching staff: 128 (107 FTE)
- Employees: 113
- Enrolment: 1,562 (August 2019)
- Colours: Light blue, white, rust
- Affiliation: Catholic Secondary Schoolgirls' Sports Association
- Website: www.ahs.qld.edu.au

All Hallows' School (AHS) is a Catholic day school for girls, located in Fortitude Valley, close to the central business district of Brisbane, Queensland, Australia.

Founded in 1861, the school is a day school, having had a boarding school attached to it for many years. It follows in the tradition of the Irish Sisters of Mercy, and caters for more than 1,730 girls from Years five to twelve. The school was the first permanent home of the Sisters of Mercy in Queensland, and is the oldest surviving secondary school in Brisbane.

All Hallows' is a member of the Association of Heads of Independent Schools of Australia (AHISA), the Alliance of Girls' Schools Australia, the Australasian Mercy Secondary Schools Association, and the Catholic Secondary Schoolgirls' Sports Association.

The school's motto is in French, Dieu et Devoir (English: "God and Duty"). This motto was formulated in 1911, 50 years after the school opened. The French language was chosen for the motto on the basis of the strong French influence in the school's early years.

Many of the All Hallows' School Buildings have been listed on the Queensland Heritage Register.

In the 2017 NAPLAN Year 9 test, All Hallows' was ranked in the top 10 Queensland secondary schools.

== History ==
=== 19th century ===
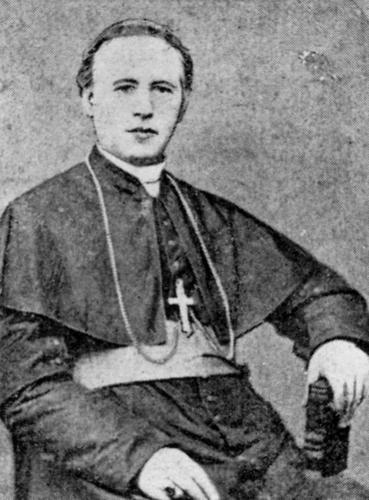
Bishop James Quinn, c. 1860

The story of the foundation of All Hallows' School must be set against the rudimentary "pioneer" education system and bitter sectarian disputes in Queensland education during the 1850s and early 1860s. According to Johnston, until 1860 "secondary education tended to receive a fairly low priority in state thinking – which was not surprising since the provision of a primary level was so difficult, too difficult to manage". He continues: "There were no state initiatives to provide its own system until 1912. Secondary education, seen as a perquisite of middle-class life, suitable for the children of business and professional men and established pastoralists, was allowed to be offered by private and church bodies."

Queensland historian Ross Fitzgerald points out that until well into the twentieth century "the majority of (Queensland Catholics) ... belonged to lower socio-economic groups".

=== First Catholic secondary school in Queensland ===
Mother Vincent Whitty, founder of All Hallows' School

Contrary to the development of most schools, All Hallows' School, as the first Catholic secondary school in Queensland, sought to serve those less fortunate in colonial society while operating under the same legislative framework as the more affluent grammar schools. Serving poorer, often Irish, Roman Catholic, immigrant women in the area of Fortitude Valley, the school did not raise the required subscription for government aid and, in a time of bitter sectarianism within Queensland, the school maintained fierce independence in curriculum from what was seen by many within the Catholic community as attempts by a hostile secular government at interference.

=== Relocation to Duncan's Hill ===
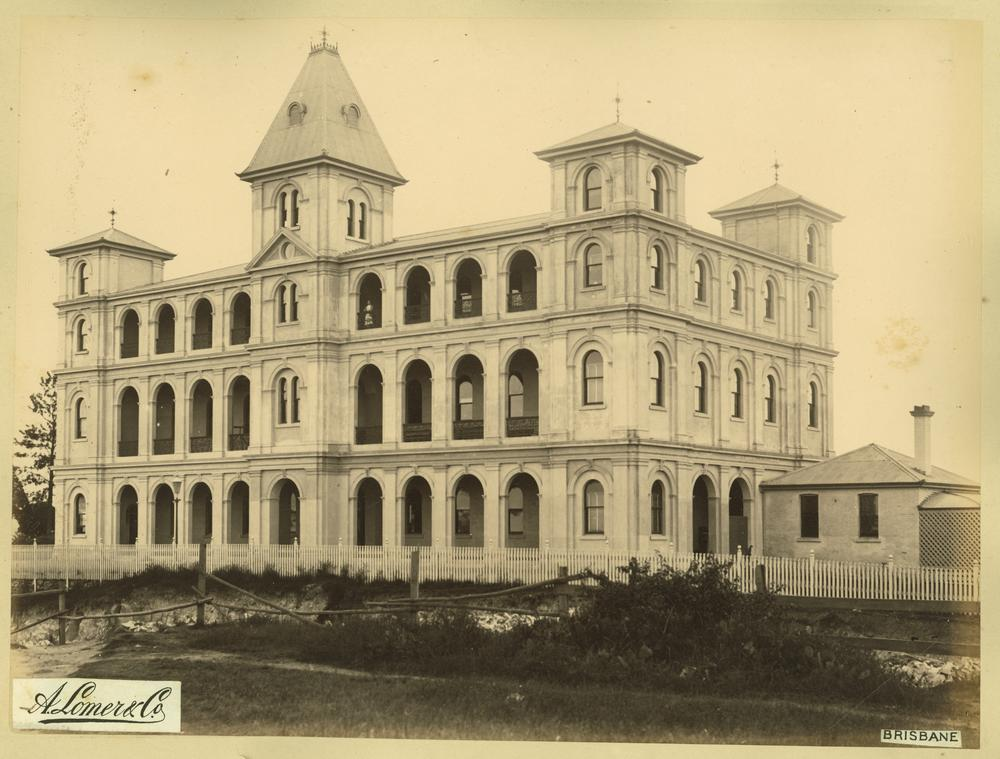
All Hallows' main building at Duncan's Hill, c. 1889

In 1863, with pupils and sisters growing in numbers, it was soon realised that a suitable place for a convent must be found. It was envisaged that a small House of Mercy would be established on the site of what would become All Hallows' School. 1 November 1863 saw the transfer of the party from a small structure adjacent to what is now Saint Stephen's Cathedral to 'Adderton House' overlooking the Brisbane River from high upon Duncan's Hill.

The Bishop has lately purchased the finest house and situation in Brisbane for a convent. The purchase money is 6,000 – where it is to come from I know not – but I trust God will send it. As soon as we get into it, we are to commence a House of Mercy ... The constant influx of Emigrants renders a House of Mercy desirable but it will not be a big one.

Mother Vincent Whitty marvelled at the position of the new house in a way that many visitors to the school have done since 1863. Writing to Ireland with news of the move to Duncan's Hill she stated:

I wish I could give you an idea of the beauty of the situation of this house. The view of the river from the Balcony is lovely and in the distance the thick bush, is here and there cleared away, with the town at one side of the River, it certainly is very beautiful.

=== Adderton House ===
Adderton House was constructed in 1858 by John Petrie for George Fullerton.

=== St Ann's Industrial School ===
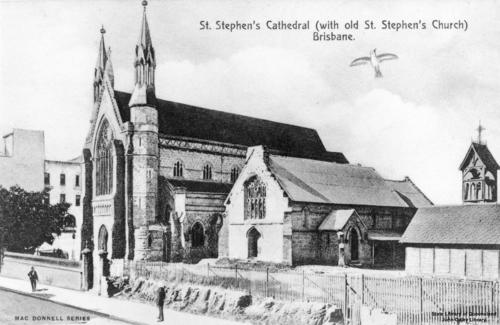
All Hallows' School 1861–1863 location within the building in the foreground of St Stephen's Cathedral, c. 1910

A 1914 image of St Ann's Industrial School (part of All Hallows' School). Road level of Ann Street, Brisbane, has been lowered on numerous occasions since 1861 and this has affected the proportions of the current gate.

St Ann's Industrial School was opened on 15 July 1894 by the Governor of Queensland Henry Wylie Norman. Its purpose was to provide a home and education to neglected or delinquent girls. It was designed by architect F. D. G. Stanley. In the 1940s it was partially converted to a boarding house for young women working in the Brisbane central business district or studying at the University of Queensland. In 1964 it was remodelled as classrooms for the All Hallows' School.

== House system ==
All Hallows' has a mixed age house structure. Every student and staff member belongs to one of the eight houses which are named after people or places within the history of the school. Each house is given a colour.

- Adderton – green, named after Adderton House, the first building on the school grounds.
- Coolock – blue, named after the house in Ireland where Catherine McAuley lived.
- Gorry – gold, named after Queensland born Mercy Sister Jane Gorry.
- Loretto – pink, named after long serving school principal Sister M. Loretto Flynn. Principal: 1916, 1933–1959.
- McAuley – silver, named after the founder of the Mercy Sisters, Catherine McAuley.
- Mercedes – orange, pronounced /mɛərˈseɪdɛs/ mair-SAY-dess as per the Spanish word for 'Mercy'.
- Tighe – purple, named after the first enrolled student at AHS, Annie Tighe.
- Whitty – red, named after the first principal of AHS, Mother Vincent Whitty.

== Notable alumnae ==
Former students of All Hallows' are known as "Past Pupils"; they may elect to join the Past Pupils' Association.

- Thea Astley, author and novelist
- Fran Bailey, member of the House of Representatives, Parliament of Australia.
- Verity Barton, LNP member of the Legislative Assembly of Queensland for Broadwater
- Isabella Bliss, winner of Junior MasterChef Australia in 2010
- Caitlin Cronin, Australian rowing team (Olympics)
- Ellen Fanning, journalist
- Diane Fingleton, first female Chief Magistrate of Queensland
- Teresa Gambaro, LNP member of House of Representatives, Parliament of Australia
- Macy Gardner, netballer
- Tahli Gill, Australian curling team (Olympics)
- Grace Grace, ALP Queensland Minister for Education
- Dr Beth Hamilton, Director of Ubuntu Through Health and Queensland Rhodes Scholar 2018
- Ernestine Hill (1899–1972), journalist, travel writer, novelist
- Marguerite Houston, Australian rowing team (Olympics)
- Miranda Kerr, model
- Mary Emelia Mayne (1858–1940), philanthropist
- Maxine McKew, ALP member of the House of Representatives seat of Bennelong
- Kateena O'Gorman, barrister and Queensland Rhodes Scholar 2003
- Sarina Russo, entrepreneur
- Grace Sewell, singer and songwriter
- Tracey Wickham, Australian swimmer (Olympics and Commonwealth Games)

== Historic images ==
Sister Jane Gorry, first Queensland-born Mercy sister

Mother Catherine McAuley – founder of Mercy Order

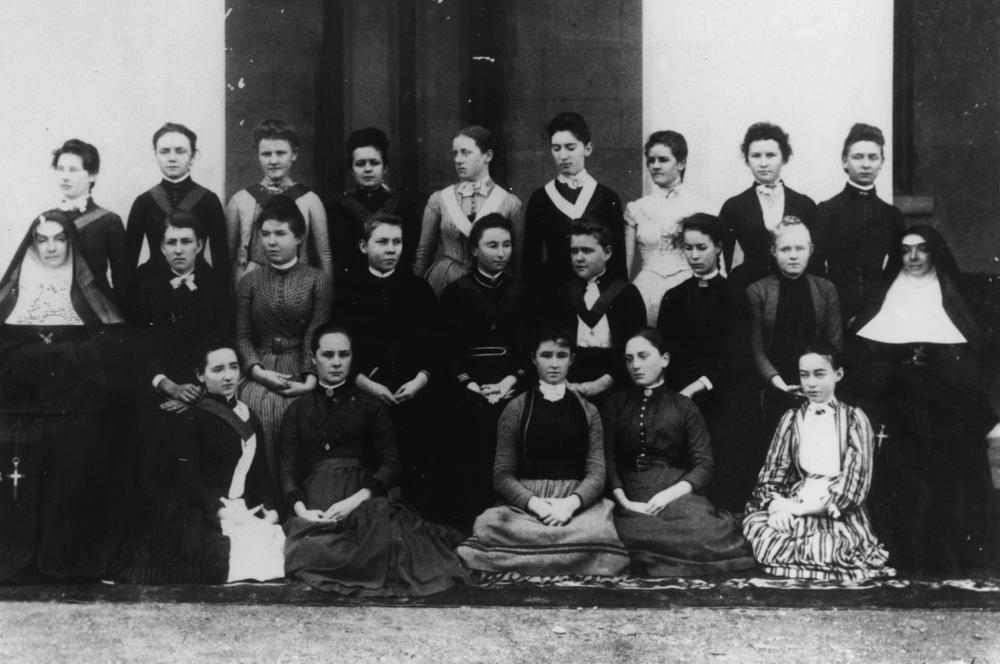
Class with their Mercy Sister teachers in 1890

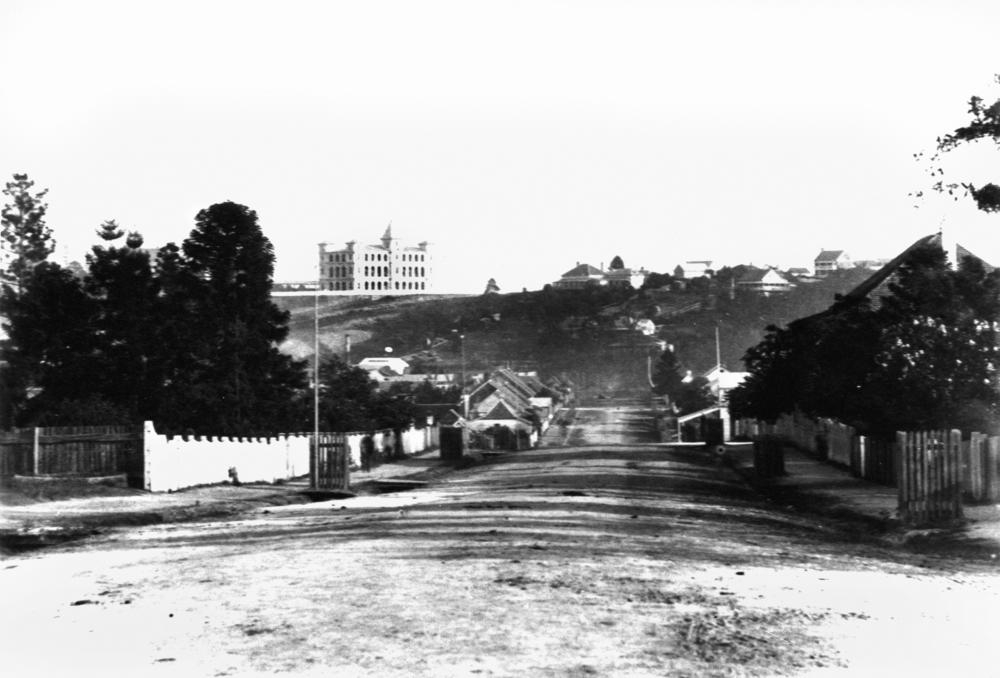
Main Street, Kangaroo Point, looking north across the Brisbane River to All Hallows' School, Duncan's Hill. The architect for the main building was Andrea Stombuco.

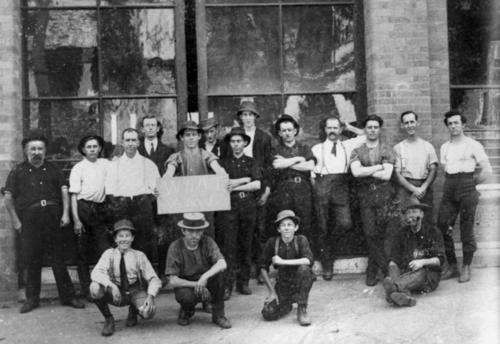
1915 photograph of the staff of Austral Carriage Works shows the facade of what is now beneath the Claver Theatre and Consilo Aquatic Complex. This facade is heritage listed and provides part of the All Hallows' School Boundary Street fence line.

== See also ==
- Lists of schools in Queensland
