= Mother Vincent Whitty =

Irish religious sister

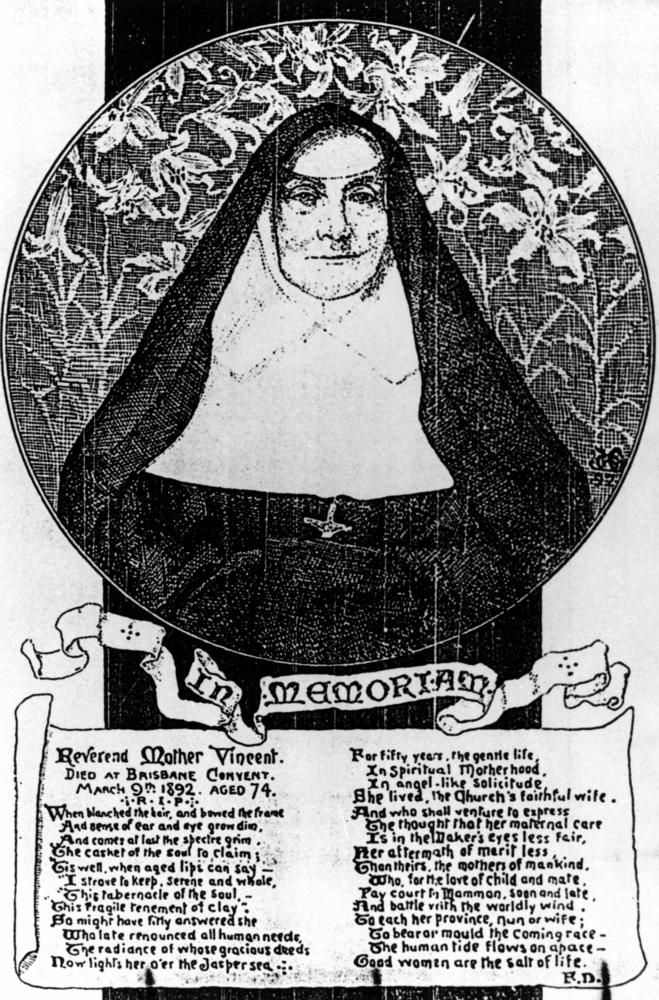
Memorial card for Mother Mary Vincent Whitty

Mother Mary Vincent Whitty, R.S.M. (3 March 1819 – 9 March 1892) was an Irish religious sister known for her work in the colony of Queensland. She was a leading figure in the Institute of the Sisters of Mercy, both in Ireland and in its expansion into the Australian colonies.

== Early life ==
She was born Ellen Whitty at Pouldarrig, near Oylegate, a village seven miles from the town of Wexford in Ireland. She was the fourth of the six children of William and Johanna Whitty (née Murphy).

One of Whitty's two sisters also became a Sister of Mercy, known as Sister Mary Agnes. The other sister married the brother of a famous convert and publicist, Frederick Lucas. Father Robert Whitty, S.J., leader of the Jesuits in Great Britain, was her brother.

== Religious life in Ireland ==
At the age of 19, Whitty joined Catherine McAuley, the founder of the Sisters of Mercy, at the convent in Baggot Street, Dublin, in 1839. Serving as Whitty's spiritual guide through her novitiate, Catherine McAuley was extremely close to her and requested Mother Vincent to sit by her side in her dying hours. She was made Mistress of novices in 1844 and in 1849 Superior General of the religious congregation, third in succession to Mother McAuley. While she was serving in that office, the Crimean War was being waged, and she offered the services of the congregation to nurse the sick and wounded soldiers. Her sister, Mary Agnes, was one of those who went to the seat of war.

Involved in the planning of the Mater Hospital in Dublin, Whitty was especially skilled in organisation and, as such, was considered invaluable to the Sisters of Mercy community in Ireland. Additionally, she founded five new convents and established three institutions in Dublin for the care of neglected children and underprivileged women.

== Religious life in Queensland ==
It was this that held Whitty in Ireland until Bishop James Quinn, who had recently been named as the first Bishop of Brisbane for Queensland, encouraged her and five Sisters to become the first women religious in his pioneer diocese. The new diocese, as large as France, Spain and Italy together, had then only two priests and four churches. Whitty's religious community was initially hesitant to release her for the missionary venture, but their reluctance was overcome by a direct order from Archbishop Cullen. Whitty was appointed as the Superior of the group.

Whitty arrived in Brisbane with five other Sisters on 10 May 1861 and, that following November, founded All Hallows' School, a Catholic girls' school. Although the bishop removed her as Superior in 1863, the community of Sisters she founded soon spread throughout the new colony, with more than 20 convents founded before her death

Bishop Quinn's decision to include Whitty in his pastoral plan proved to be inspirational, and under her leadership, the Sisters of Mercy were able to make a positive contribution to the growth of the Catholic community throughout Queensland.

== Later life ==
Following an attack of bronchitis, Whitty died at All Hallows' Convent in Brisbane on 9 March 1892. Her funeral service was held in the Cathedral of St Stephen, Brisbane, and she was buried in the Nudgee Catholic Cemetery.

== Legacy ==
She left behind "a group of 222 Sisters in 26 schools of 7000 students and welfare institutions protecting some 200 children" (Mercy Women, 2001, p. ix). A Mercy Training College for teachers had also been established at Nudgee. In addition to the various educational institutions founded under her leadership, the Sisters of Mercy of Brisbane form an independent congregation within the tradition of Catherine McAuley. A street in Canberra was named after her, in honour of her contribution to Australian education. A thesis about Whitty's influence on education in Queensland was also completed in 1969 at the University of Queensland.
