= Kurrowah =

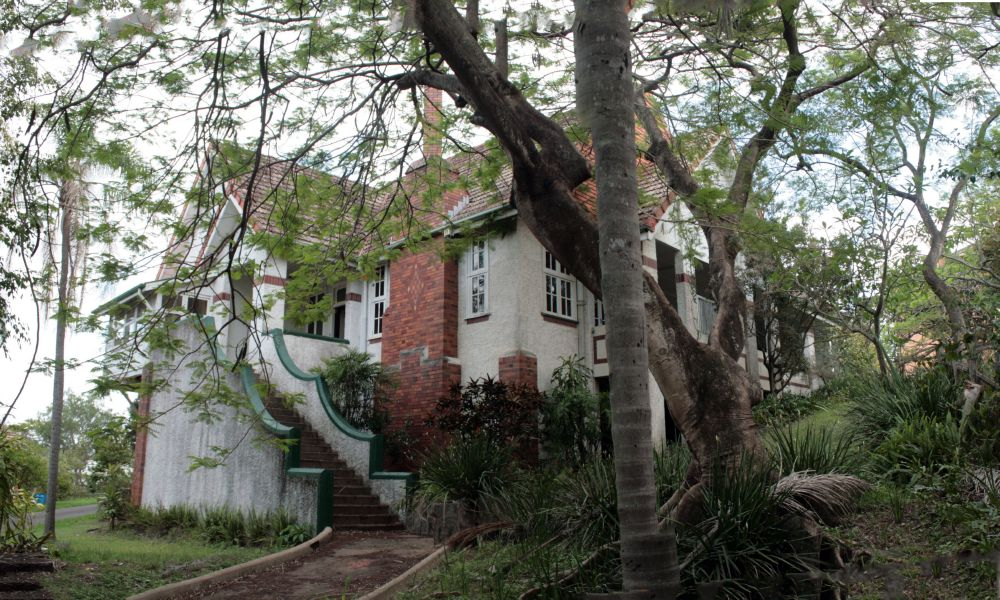
- Kurrowah, 2013

- Location within Queensland Location within Australia
- 27.494°S 153.0239°E
- Location: 218 Gladstone Road, Dutton Park, City of Brisbane, Queensland, Australia

History
- Design period: 1914–1919 (World War I)
- Built: 1915–1916

Site notes
- Architect: Lange Leopold Powell

Queensland Heritage Register
- Official name: Kurrowah
- Type: state heritage (built)
- Designated: 13 June 2014
- Reference no.: 602827
- Significant period: 1915–

Kurrowah is a heritage-listed mansion at 218 Gladstone Road, Dutton Park, City of Brisbane, Queensland, Australia. It was designed by Lange Leopold Powell and built from 1915 to 1916. It was added to the Queensland Heritage Register on 13 June 2014.

== History ==
Kurrowah, a rendered masonry, timber and tile residence on Gladstone Road, Dutton Park, in Brisbane, was designed by Lange Leopold Powell and constructed in 1915–1916. It is a rare and intact example of the residential work of this noted Queensland architect. This house, with a designed and crafted interior, is set on high ground, giving it views to the west and south.

The area now known as Dutton Park developed slowly. Initially it was thickly timbered, deeply gullied land. From the 1840s farms were established near the river. Early land owners included Edward Deighton (Under-Secretary, Department of Public Works and Mines 1877–78) whose house "Wahcumba" was situated on a large estate off Gladstone Road. By 1883 there were about ten residences along Gladstone Road, most on the ridge overlooking the river and on large allotments. Dutton Park railway station opened in 1884. Subdivision of land from large land holdings, such as the Deighton Estate (between Boggo Road, now Annerley Road, and James Street, now Lochaber Street), followed during Brisbane's 1880s land boom. The first horse-drawn bus service linking Dutton Park with the city commenced in 1890 and was replaced by electric tram along Gladstone Road by 1908. This stimulated rapid development of the area and almost doubled land values. In 1914 the suburb was named in honour of Charles Dutton, Secretary of Public Lands between 1883 and 1887, and by the 1920s the area was considered fashionable.

The land on which Kurrowah stands was sold to Edward Deighton c. 1860. The eastern portion of his estate adjoining Annerley Road was subdivided during the 1880s, as the Deighton Estate. Three larger blocks (totalling 2 acres 2 roods 18 1/2 perches (1.059 ha) were also created. A new certificate for this land, which included the site of the future Kurrowah, was issued to Abraham Fleetwood Luya (timber merchant, South Brisbane Alderman and later South Brisbane Mayor and Member of the Queensland Legislative Assembly for South Brisbane) in 1888 and a house was built on the site, in which Luya was resident by 1889. He sold the property in 1894 to Anna Magdalena Heinecke, wife of Frederick W Heinecke (manager of the nearby Virginia Tobacco factory), who was listed by the Queensland Post Office Directory as living at "Linden" on Gladstone Road, between Gloucester and James Streets, by 1896.

During the 1880s Brisbane had grown spectacularly. The population more than doubled to over 90,000 in 1891, primarily due to immigration. This stimulated building activity, municipal organisation, provision of amenities and services, and cultural and leisure outlets. The number of inhabited dwellings almost doubled between 1881 and 1891, from 5,814 to 10,321. Aided by the requirement of the Undue Subdivision of Land Prevention Act 1885, which enforced a minimum allotment size, this population increase caused Brisbane to overshoot its boundaries, growing along the lines of transport (railway, road, tram and omnibus routes which were dictated by the hilly topography of the area) until the town coalesced with its fringe settlements transforming them into suburbs.

By the beginning of the twentieth century, Brisbane was the largest administrative, commercial and industrial centre in Queensland. Two-thirds of the colony's imports were unloaded onto Brisbane wharves. Administration had become centralised and risen in importance with the expansion of government services. The number of civil servants (excluding teachers) had increased, many of whom were located in Brisbane. Increasingly private organisations were established in, or relocated to, Brisbane, centralising control there. With its population of 119,428 in 1901 the city had a sophistication and diversity not found elsewhere in Queensland.

In February 1909 the Queensland Figaro reported that "Mr Frank Brodribb has purchased 'Linden', Gladstone Road, a handsome residence with charming grounds, occupied for some time by Mr and Mrs Pickworth. Mr Brodribb with his family will shortly take up residence there". Titles show that the 2-acre-2-rood-18 1/2-perch (1.059 ha) property was purchased in his wife's name, Jessie Scott Brodribb, in November 1908.

The Brodribb family was part of Brisbane's upper stratum of society, which at this time still comprised graziers, leading businessmen and professional men. Frank Kenric Brodribb was the son of Darling Downs property-owner Francis Claudius Brodribb, whose sheep station, "Kurrowah", was located between Millmerran and Cecil Plains (now the locality of Kurrowah). The elder Brodribb died in 1904 leaving a considerable estate, including his station, in trust for his four daughters and only son. Frank K Brodribb appears to have owned other properties in Brisbane, including a house in Bower Street off Gladstone Road in 1916 and, until its sale in 1917, a commercial building in Queen Street, Brisbane, occupied by the Union Bank of Australia. Jessie Brodribb was a daughter of early Queensland settler and builder John Campbell. The couple married in September 1904 at St Andrews Anglican Church, South Brisbane. They resided in the vicinity of Dutton Park from about 1908 after moving from Toowoomba.

By 18 February 1909 the Brodribbs were in residence at 'Linden'. They quickly renamed the residence 'Kurrowah' and their second son was born there in July of that year. Social occasions and fund-raising events held at Kurrowah were often centred on the garden; with guest lists including the state's social elite.

In January 1915, architectural firm Chambers and Powell called tenders "for the erection and completion of [a] Brick Residence, Gladstone-road". Drawings for its construction and that of a garage with pit, man's room, workshop, washing down shed and WC date the design to January 1914. In February 1916, the Brodribb's land was re-configured from three blocks to two with the former "Linden" (labelled `Old House') on the block to the east (Resub 2, 1ac 19.7p (4545m2)) and a "New House" on the block to the west (Resub 1, 1 acre (0.40 ha) 1 rood 34 perches (1,900 m^{2})). Construction of the new Kurrowah was completed by 1916 when it was included in the Queensland Post Office Directory 1916–17 edition.

The siting of the new house conforms to the preference of Brisbane's wealthier residents to site their homes on its hill tops and ridges, seeking "space, air, view, breeze, drainage, display... combined with a rustic home, they ... also settled ... on acreages outside the town boundaries". Initially Brisbane's social divisions, as in Australia's other capitals, were topographical (between ridge or hill and gully) but later in the nineteenth century, especially after the introduction of mass transport such as trams and trains, increasingly whole suburbs acquired class labels.

No description of the house appeared in the media at the time of its completion. However, newspaper articles reporting later social events reveal that the "wide tile piazza was utilised for dancing.... Supper was served in the lounge". On another occasion, "[t]he reception rooms were beautified with [flowers].... The supper table...was set in the large panelled dining room.... Dancing was enjoyed on the wide, tiled piazza". There was a concrete tennis court in the grounds from at least 1923 which was utilised for tennis and jazz parties.

Domestic architecture in Australia in the first two decades of the twentieth century was notable for its use of popular architectural treatments characterised by a conservative eclecticism. Before the modern movement shunned the predilection for styles, English Queen Anne and Arts and Crafts influences were slowly supplanted by the Californian Bungalow and Spanish Mission styles from The United States of America in the quest for architecture appropriate for Australian conditions. Another development, in the yards of affluent home owners, was the introduction of the garage in the back yard adjacent to the fence, usually in materials matching the house, to house the newly acquired car.

The design of Kurrowah demonstrates this evolution and these preferences of the affluent classes at this period. Architectural influences evident in the design of Kurrowah are mostly derived from England and the work of architects such as Charles Voysey, combined with some features in common with the Bungalow. Essentially romantic in style, it has steep gabled roofs with decorative terracotta tiling, tall slender chimneys and deep recessed verandahs supported on substantial masonry piers. The drama of the exterior with its contrasting exterior finishes (light-coloured roughcast walls against dark brick work, shingles, mouldings and timber detailing) was repeated in the interior with dark timber panelling, ceiling beams and battens contrasted against smooth light-coloured friezes, ceilings and heavily decorated plaster embellishments.

Kurrowah demonstrates a progression in the evolution of domestic architectural planning and decoration. Whilst maintaining picturesque influences such as nooks and bays, a move toward functionalism in line with overseas fashion is evident. The developing rationale provided rooms arranged for greater convenience, more attuned to the occupants' needs and the environmental benefits of aspect. The central hall is wider in the vicinity of the more public areas of the house to accommodate this active area; the piazzas and morning room provide outdoor living, appropriate for the climate; the kitchen is integrated as an ordinary room and features such as built-in cupboards and wardrobes are provided for greater convenience. The move towards a simpler, healthier, coherently arranged, easy to maintain interior is evident in the choice of finishes such as timber wall panelling and parquetry floors.

Kurrowah's architect, Lange Leopold Powell, was born on 2 July 1886 in Rockhampton. Educated in Brisbane, he was articled to Brisbane architectural firm Addison and Corrie. After he completed his training and gained some experience he travelled to England in 1908, where he joined the London architectural firm of Belcher & Co. Returning to Australia in 1910 he married in April 1911. In the following year he formed a partnership with Claude William Chambers (Chambers and Powell) based in Brisbane. During 1915 Chambers moved to Sydney to practise, leaving Powell working in Brisbane. In 1920 Powell began practising on his own. Between 1922 and 1924 he was in partnership with George Hutton (Queensland Government Architect). He practised on his own again between 1925 and 1927 before going into partnership as Atkinson, Powell and Conrad from 1927 to 1930. This was followed by a partnership with his senior draftsman, George Rae from 1931 to 1933; followed again by sole practice until his death on 29 October 1938.

During this career Powell played a significant role in the development of the architecture profession. He served as honorary secretary (1910–15), councillor, vice-president (1923–27) and president (1927–31) of the Queensland Institute of Architects; became a member of Queensland's first Board of Architects and for many years was the Queensland representative on the Australian Institute of Architects' federal council and its president from 1928 to 1929. With Sir Charles Rosenthal he drafted the constitution of the Royal Australian Institute of Architects (1930) and became its second president (1932–33). He also represented the Queensland Board of Architects on the R.A.I.A.'s board of architectural education. He became a fellow of the Queensland Institute of Architects (1918), the Royal Institute of British Architects (1929) and the R.A.I.A. (1930).

Powell is noted for his commercial buildings and churches employing a diversity of styles. His obituary in 1938 described him as one of Brisbane's leading architects. Anglican Archbishop of Brisbane, John William Charles Wand praised him saying, "he had done much to beautify St John's Cathedral", and that Powell "was a genuine artist whose love of beauty was his master passion.... He delighted to use his gift for religious purposes. The great Masonic Temple in Brisbane will long remain to keep his memory green in the minds of those who admired his art". A number of Powell-designed buildings are entered in the Queensland Heritage Register namely:

- Austral Motors Building, Fortitude Valley
- BAFS Building, Brisbane CBD
- Ballow Chambers, Spring Hill
- Holy Trinity Church, Mackay
- Masonic Temple, Brisbane CBD
- National Bank of Australasia, Mossman
- St Andrews Uniting Church, Bundaberg
- St Martin's House, Brisbane CBD
- St Mark's Anglican Church, Warwick

His design contributions to other churches illustrate his interest in interior decoration; such as the carved-stone reredos in Holy Trinity Church, Fortitude Valley) and the altar and triptych (painted by William Bustard) for the Lady Chapel of St John's Cathedral, Brisbane CBD).

Powell also designed about 30 houses and remodelled or made additions to another five. Of the other 29 Powell-designed houses only five are known to survive. These are:

- his own residence at 50 Eldernell Terrace, Hamilton, dating from 1923
- 26 Thornbury Street, Spring Hill (1912)
- 3 Moreton Street, New Farm, built for Mr A S Huybers in 1918
- Mrs O Sandel's Residence in Windemere Road, Hamilton dating from 1920
- a house for builder, George Stronach in Eldernell Terrace, Hamilton, built in 1931.

Powell's houses, mostly for wealthy clients, were of generous proportions and located in the select suburbs of Brisbane like Hamilton and Clayfield. Kurrowah's features are characteristic of his residential work and adhered to the stylistic preference of his clients and the period. In her undergraduate thesis on Powell, Margaret Kerr noted the characteristics of his residential work: solid brickwork with a stucco finish; steeply pitched tiled roofs; gable ends; tall chimneys; roof overhangs with exposed rafters; double-hung or casement windows; a broad flight of concrete entrance stairs with a solid balustrade of sweeping curves; a timber entrance porch and often an adjoining piazza; brick porch piers with stucco finish and red brick capping detail. Features specific to his brick houses included: arches in the base wall to assist with subfloor ventilation; gable ends finished with shingles or flat sheet with wide battens for a half-timbered effect; fireplaces finished with face brickwork. His interiors included dark oak panelling in the entrance hall and living room to door head height, with papered friezes; and fibrous plaster ceilings with elaborate decoration in the more expensive homes. Built-in cupboards were common.

All of these features constituted the home of a well-off Brisbane family. The lifestyle of the Brodribb family, which included regular entertaining, holidays and travel, was that of members of Queensland's upper social stratum. Substantial funds generated by a trust established at Francis Claudius Brodribb's death were successfully managed by his son-in-law, Canon Thomas Pughe. In 1924 part of that estate, "Kurrowah", a 53,504 acres (21,652 ha) pastoral property comprising, plains, river flats and open forest country with about 13 miles (21 km) of Condamine River frontage, which had produced good quality wool, was sold; realising a significant sum of money for the beneficiaries.

All of Kurrowah's extensions were built during the Brodribb's ownership. By 1923 a suspended timber verandah, accessed through the panelled drawing room had been added to the front elevation. In 1923 a timber extension was added to the master bedroom at the rear. At this time a garage with attached accommodation was located where the current cottage stands. Floor plans dating from after 1930, show plans for the conversion of this garage with accommodation into a cottage and use of one of the public rooms as a bedroom. By 1946, but probably prior to 1938, a further extension at the rear, creating a fifth bedroom, was added.

In 1938 Mrs Brodribb attempted to sell Kurrowah but was not successful. The house at the time was described by Isles, Loves & Co Pty Ltd, auctioneers, as follows: "Kurrowah" occupies one of the finest sites with beautiful views of river, city and mountains, and is situated on the corner of Gladstone and Deighton Roads, containing an area of 1 acre 1 rood 34 perches (0.59 ha). "Kurrowah" was designed by one of Brisbane's leading architects and is built of brick, concrete and stucco, with tiled roof in the Jacobean period of architecture and the interior is finished in a manner befitting such a fine home. The foundations were designed to carry another stor(e)y if so desired.

There are 5 bedrooms, dressing room, den, music room and balcony, piazza with tiled floor to (the) Eastern side, 2 bathrooms, laundry and all modern conveniences throughout, kitchen, pantry and maid's room, 3 separate garages, man's room, tennis court, lawns etc.

In December 1940 Frank Kenric Brodribb died at the Mater Misericordiae Hospital at South Brisbane, aged 71. The following June, Kurrowah was subdivided into five lots with the house occupying the large central lot while four small lots of between about 25 and 31 perches (630 and 780 m^{2}) were excised from the garden. These were auctioned on 28 June 1941. Described as:

4 Magnificent Blocks being part of Mrs F K Brodribb's beautiful property, situated on the corner of Gladstone and Deighton Roads, occupying one of the finest positions. High with excellent views and on the tramline. Every convenience – gas, water, electric light and sewerage available, bitumen roads. Three lots were sold immediately and the fourth in 1944.

By 1946, two of these sites had been built upon. This subdivision conforms to the trend, which The Courier-Mail reported in 1938, of renewed interest in subdivision of land in Brisbane after a long-term lull during and after the Depression.

Mrs Brodribb died in May 1951 and the property passed to her son, Kenric Colin Campbell Brodribb and Queensland Trustees Ltd. Kurrowah was sold in February 1953 to Francis Arthur Rushbrook, who in turn sold it to Robert and Mary Murray in 1955. No additions were made to the house during the Murray's ownership and its interior remains highly intact. This level of intactness is uncommon in houses that are almost a century old, and although there have been minor alterations, the quality of its interior design and decorative character is apparent. Extension to the cottage and the addition of a small structure beside the double garage, used as accommodation by the Murray's gardener, date from after 1946.

Although nearby houses including the former "Linden" (later called "Mangerton" by its owner, Dr Morgan Lane) were demolished for higher density housing, Kurrowah remained a family home set in a large garden, although surrounded by suburban development. The Murray family retained the property until its sale in 2013.

== Description ==
Kurrowah is a substantial, rendered brick residence standing on a high ridge in Dutton Park. The allotment is over 1,000 square metres (11,000 sq ft) and a "battle axe block", with the house accessed via a long driveway from Gladstone Road. Behind the house (to the north) are ancillary buildings along the rear boundary. The one-storey house faces south-west, down the sloping yard to Gladstone Road, and has striking vistas to the southern mountain ranges.

The house is designed in an eclectic, revival style with a solid character relieved by decorative patterns with Scottish references in architectural and decorative details. The building form is dynamic with multiple projecting rooms sheltered by steep, intersecting gables. The gable ends are decorated with timber panelling or terracotta shingles and the barge boards are moulded terracotta tiles. The exterior walls are roughcast stucco painted white with bands of red facebrick outlining features of the building. The same brick is used for three carefully modelled chimneys, which rise from sturdy bases to tall, slender stacks. It is high-set on brick piers at the front and low-set at the rear, and the understorey is accessible through arched openings in the perimeter wall. The windows are primarily two banks of small, timber-framed casements with multiple panes.

A wide verandah "piazza" runs along the south-eastern side.

The north-eastern side is the rear of the house and the gable ends here are clad with weatherboards and are vented with timber louvres. Projecting from the southern end of this side is a timber-framed, weatherboard-clad room with a hipped roof clad with terracotta tiles. It has a hexagonal end wall and windows that include later, timber-framed casements with green lights. At the northern end of the north-eastern side is a piazza, enclosed with more recent timber-framed awning windows.

The north-western side is less articulated and shelters a small back-of-house court, reflecting its service rooms inside. A timber-framed room projects from the northern end. It has walls clad with weatherboards and a pyramidal roof clad with terracotta tiles with a terracotta finial. The windows in this room are also later, timber-framed casements with green lights. This room is set on masonry piers with roughcast stucco. In the understorey under the kitchen at the southern end of this side is a laundry.

From the front, the house looms over the drive, which passes the house on the western side to reach the garages behind. A concrete path, with impressed and coloured diamond shapes, winds up from near the road to the front concrete stair with heavy, sweeping rendered masonry balustrades. The chimney breast is conspicuous with a central, decorative diamond pattern of polychromatic bricks. A small, gabled porch with a colourful, tessellated tile floor shelters the front entrance. At the western end of the front elevation is a later timber-framed porch, clad with sheets and battens and enclosed with more recent timber-framed awning windows.

The front door is timber with a high waist and a large glazed top panel. A small brass knocker has a portrait of William Wallace with sword and features "SCOTLAND", "WALLACE" and "ANNO DOM MCCCVI" (1305, the year of Wallace's death), above which are two kangaroos holding a thistle. The fanlight of the front door and the adjacent hall window are divided into small panes by lead cames.

The layout of the house comprises principal reception rooms at the front (south-west) with discreet service rooms on the western side and a separate bedroom wing at the rear (north-east). Circulation is via a central hall divided into distinct sections, reflecting hierarchy of use: wide and decorative in the front hall; narrower and less-decorative in the bedroom wing; and less-decorative still in the service rooms. The reception rooms include a drawing, dining, and morning rooms; den; and another room, designated as a bedroom by the 1930s. The adjacent service area includes a scullery, kitchen, and maid's room. The bedroom wing includes a master bedroom with adjoining dressing room, three other bedrooms, bathroom, and toilet.

The house interior has a distinctly heavy character brought about through an extensive use of dark-stained timber wall panelling, small windows, deep-relief plasterwork on principal ceilings, and other weighty decorative treatments. A distinctive feature of the house is the use of splayed window and door reveals in the front hall and the drawing room, which serve to reduce glare and also to suggest a thicker wall, inferring a weightier construction. The internal partitions are rendered masonry with high-quality, moulded timber joinery throughout and the house retains original timber built-in wardrobes. The house retains early electrical lighting including early fittings and shades, an electrical servant bell system, and original door and window hardware. The dressing room retains an early pedestal basin. The bathroom and kitchen fit-outs are not original. The timber-framed extensions have walls and ceilings lined with sheet material with timber batten cover strips.

The south-eastern piazza is reached through timber-framed, glazed French doors from the south-eastern rooms. The piazza floor is colourful, tessellated tiles on a suspended concrete slab. Two murals depicting bucolic scenes are painted on the piazza walls. At the northern end of the bedroom wing is the enclosed piazza. Its floor is recent ceramic tiles that are not of cultural heritage significance. Doors into this room are original French doors, re-fashioned to be bi-folding.

Three ancillary buildings stand against the rear (northern) boundary. From east to west these are; the cottage, the garages, and a small timber structure of one room. The cottage is a low-set, one-storey building with a roughcast rendered masonry core, a steep, timber-framed hipped roof clad with terracotta tiles, and two banks of small, casement windows that match those of the main house, including hardware. (Later, lightweight extensions to the core are not of cultural heritage significance.) The garages comprise two attached, timber-framed structures and the construction shows the western garage was built first. The earlier garage has a timber board floor while the later garage has a concrete floor. Both are rectangular, timber-framed structures clad externally with cement sheets. Both have a gable roof with timber battened gable ends; the earlier roof is clad with terracotta tiles and the later roof with corrugated metal sheets. The small timber structure of one room is an early timber building, set on low concrete block stumps with metal ant caps. It is a one-storey, timber-framed building with a hipped roof clad with corrugated metal sheets. The sides and rear are clad with v-jointed timber boards the front is clad with later timber chamferboards. The side and rear walls have a timber, lattice ventilation panel with a coarse metal insect screen and it retains an early timber-framed, sliding sash of fixed timber louvres.

The garden consists of exotic specimen trees and lawn with early concrete garden beds. The front fence includes early low, masonry walls of Brisbane tuff with prominent mortar.

== Heritage listing ==
Kurrowah was listed on the Queensland Heritage Register on 13 June 2014 having satisfied the following criteria.

The place is important in demonstrating the evolution or pattern of Queensland's history.

Kurrowah (1915–1916) is important in illustrating the contribution of notable architect, Lange Leopold Powell, to the evolution of Queensland's domestic architecture.

It is important evidence of the lifestyle of Queensland's prosperous elite in Brisbane's suburbs in the early twentieth century.

The place demonstrates rare, uncommon or endangered aspects of Queensland's cultural heritage.

Kurrowah is a rare and intact example of an architect-designed domestic interior from the early twentieth century.

The place is important in demonstrating the principal characteristics of a particular class of cultural places.

Kurrowah is an intact representative example of the early twentieth century housing type preferred by residents. It is sited on a spacious allotment on a hill top near the river, orientated to capture views and breezes. Characteristically, these houses: were architect-designed; used quality materials; had a slightly modified traditional floor plan with a distinct hierarchy of rooms; and included facilities for servants and accommodation for a motor vehicle.

The place is important because of its aesthetic significance.

Located within a garden setting in an elevated position removed from the road with views to the west and south, Kurrowah is of aesthetic significance for its attractive Romantic form and composition. Designed by notable Queensland interwar architect Lange L Powell, it features a skilful use of stylistic treatments, a striking use of decoration and generously proportioned planning. Its fine interior craftsmanship is significant for its high degree of creative achievement. The highly intact interior displays considerable artistic value.
