= Holy Trinity Church, Mackay =

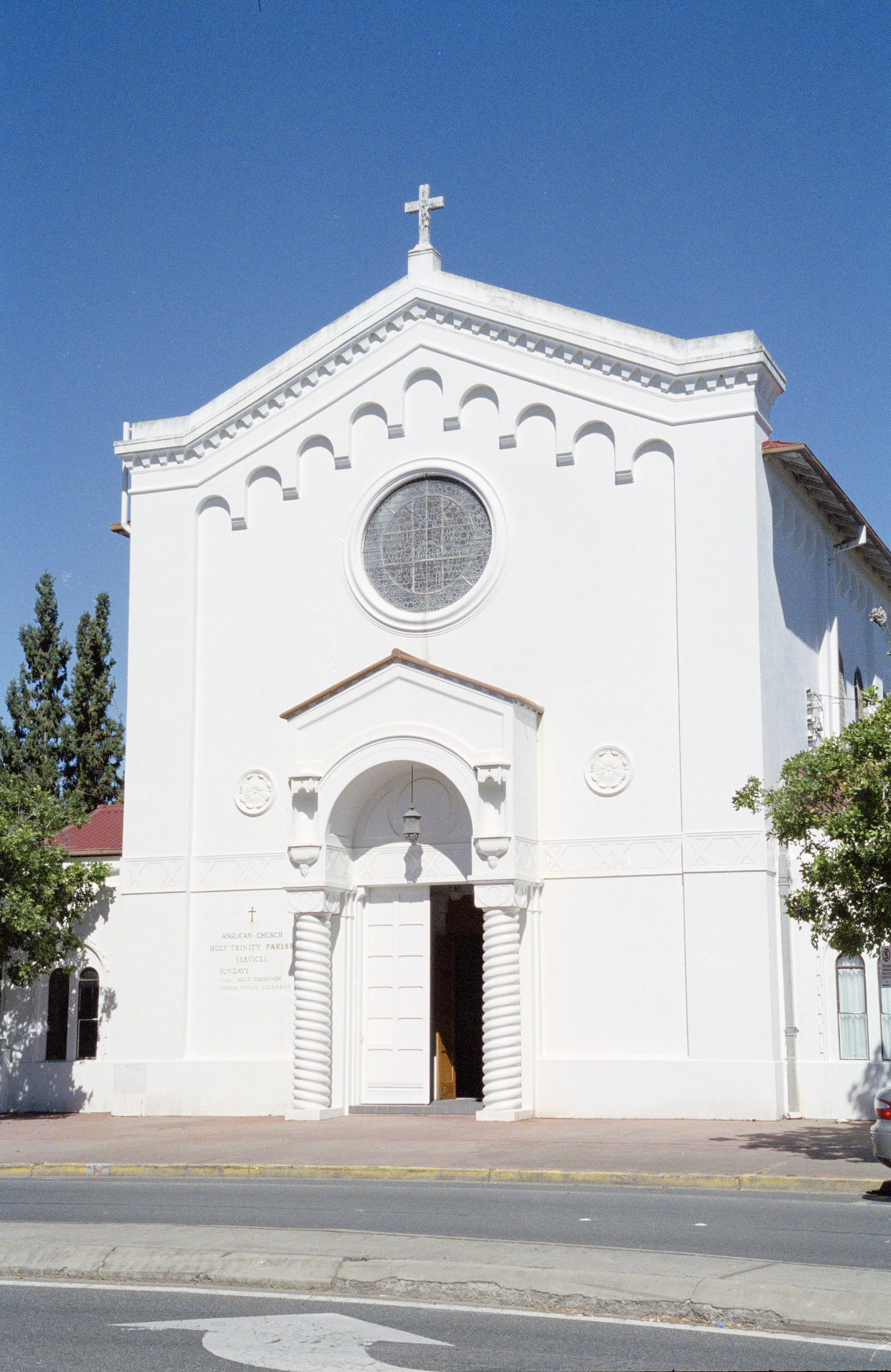
- Front entry of the Holy Trinity Church Mackay, 2005

- Location within Queensland Location within Australia
- 21.1437°S 149.1861°E
- Location: 39 Gordon Street, Mackay, Mackay Region, Queensland, Australia

History
- Design period: 1919–1930s (interwar period)
- Built: c. 1926

Site notes
- Architect: Lange Leopold Powell

Queensland Heritage Register
- Official name: Holy Trinity Church Complex, Holy Trinity Church, parish Hall and Presbytery
- Type: state heritage (built)
- Designated: 29 April 2003
- Reference no.: 601111
- Significant period: 1920s
- Significant components: decorative features, residential accommodation – rectory, stained glass window/s, furniture/fittings, hall, church, views to
- Builders: A Stonage and Sons

Holy Trinity Church is a heritage-listed Anglican church at 39 Gordon Street, Mackay, Mackay Region, Queensland, Australia. It was designed in 1923 by Lange Leopold Powell and built by A Stonage and Sons, completing in 1926. It is also known as Holy Trinity Church Complex. It was added to the Queensland Heritage Register on 29 April 2003.

== History ==
The Holy Trinity Church, Mackay was constructed as the third church on the site and the first masonry church. The building was completed in 1926, although the design is thought to have been completed by 1923 by Brisbane architect Lange Powell. The church precinct was supplemented by a parish hall and rectory in the late 1930s.

The Church of England Diocese of Brisbane was formed at the time of Queensland's establishment as a separate colony in 1859 and took over what had been the Newcastle Diocese which had extended ten miles north of present-day Mackay. North of this area remained within the Diocese of Sydney. The district discovered by John Mackay in 1860 was thus already within a defined ecclesiastical district and Mackay alone, of the parishes of Northern Queensland, had been under the auspices of the Brisbane Diocese since the separation of Queensland. Mackay was later incorporated into the Diocese of North Queensland which was formed in 1878.

John Mackay and his party had discovered what was to become the Pioneer Valley in 1860. The present city blocks were surveyed in June 1863 when the settlement consisted of several dozen huts and tents in a line along a track parallel to the southern bank of the river, and the first land sale was held at the police office, Bowen, on 13 October 1863. Among the speculators was Edward Wyndham Tufnell, Bishop of the Church of England, Brisbane, who purchased six lots in the heart of town for £396. A further twenty acres of land on what is now Nebo Road was purchased by Bishop Tufnell at a later date.

While early settlers in Mackay were cattlemen, it was soon realised that the soil, climate and rainfall were suitable for the growing of sugar-cane. The growth of the sugar industry was accelerated by the Sugar and Coffee Regulations of 1864 and by the 1880s a system of plantation agriculture had developed.

The first Church of England service in Mackay was conducted by Bishop Tufnell at the Mackay Court House in 1863. By 1867 the Parish of Mackay was established and land for the construction of a church was purchased on 11 August 1869. The building of the church at a time of depressed economic circumstances reflects a strong commitment by the congregation to their religious beliefs. None of the six town lots purchased by Bishop Tufnell was used for the site of the first Holy Trinity Church.

The first Trinity church was completed in 1871 of an English design with a steeply pitched roof covered with wood shingles. It was built of stone but collapsed in 1878 possibly because of a defect in the foundations. The Mackay Mercury reported on 10 March 1878:

"Last Sunday morning, during the heavy rainfall, we regret to state that the gable end of Trinity Church fell with a great crash and destroyed a considerable portion of the altar and Church furniture. The building had been in a dangerous state for some time past and, judging from the numerous cracks in the walls, and imperfect foundations, it is a wonder it has stood for so long."

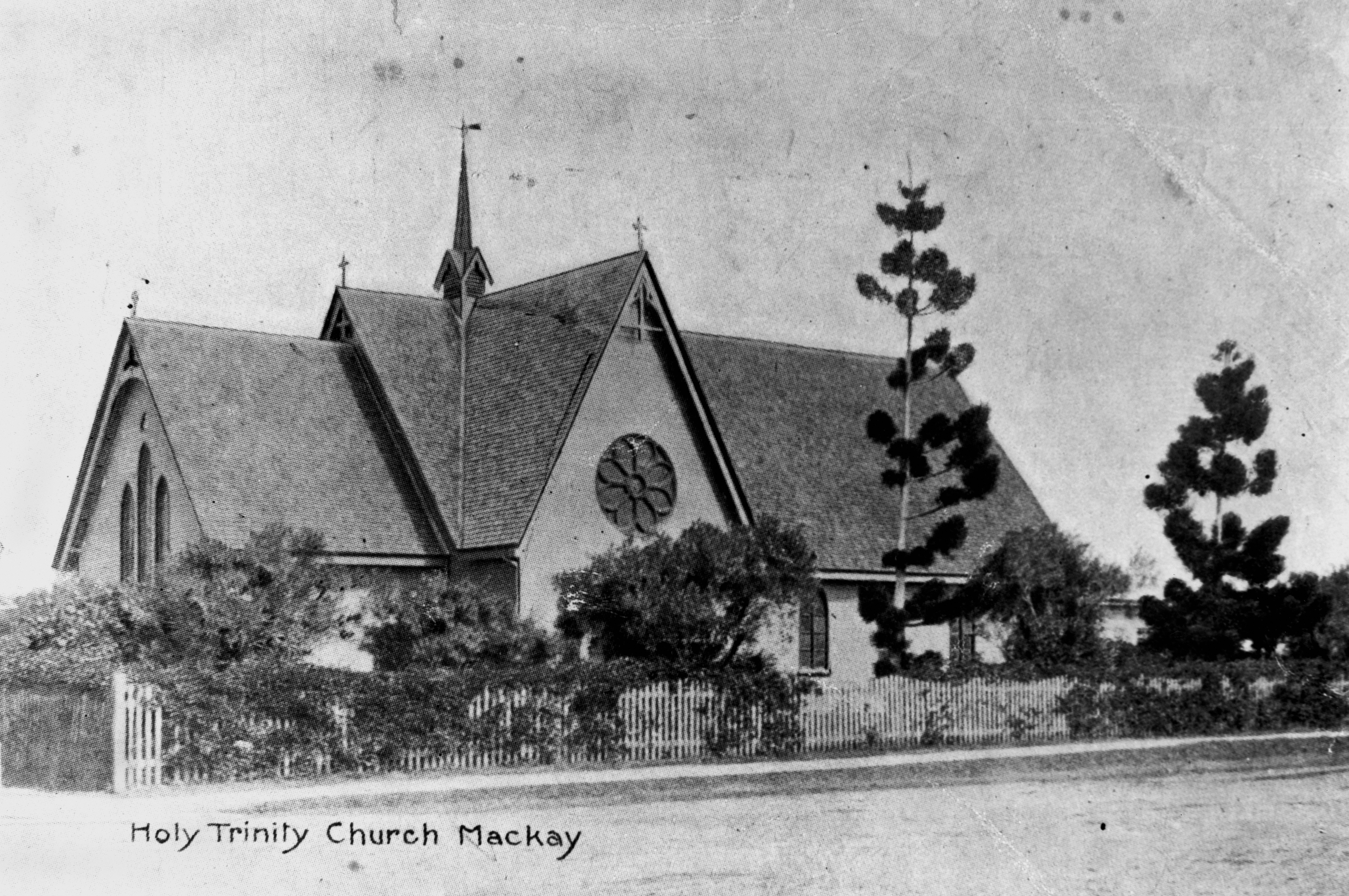
Second Holy Trinity Anglican church at Mackay

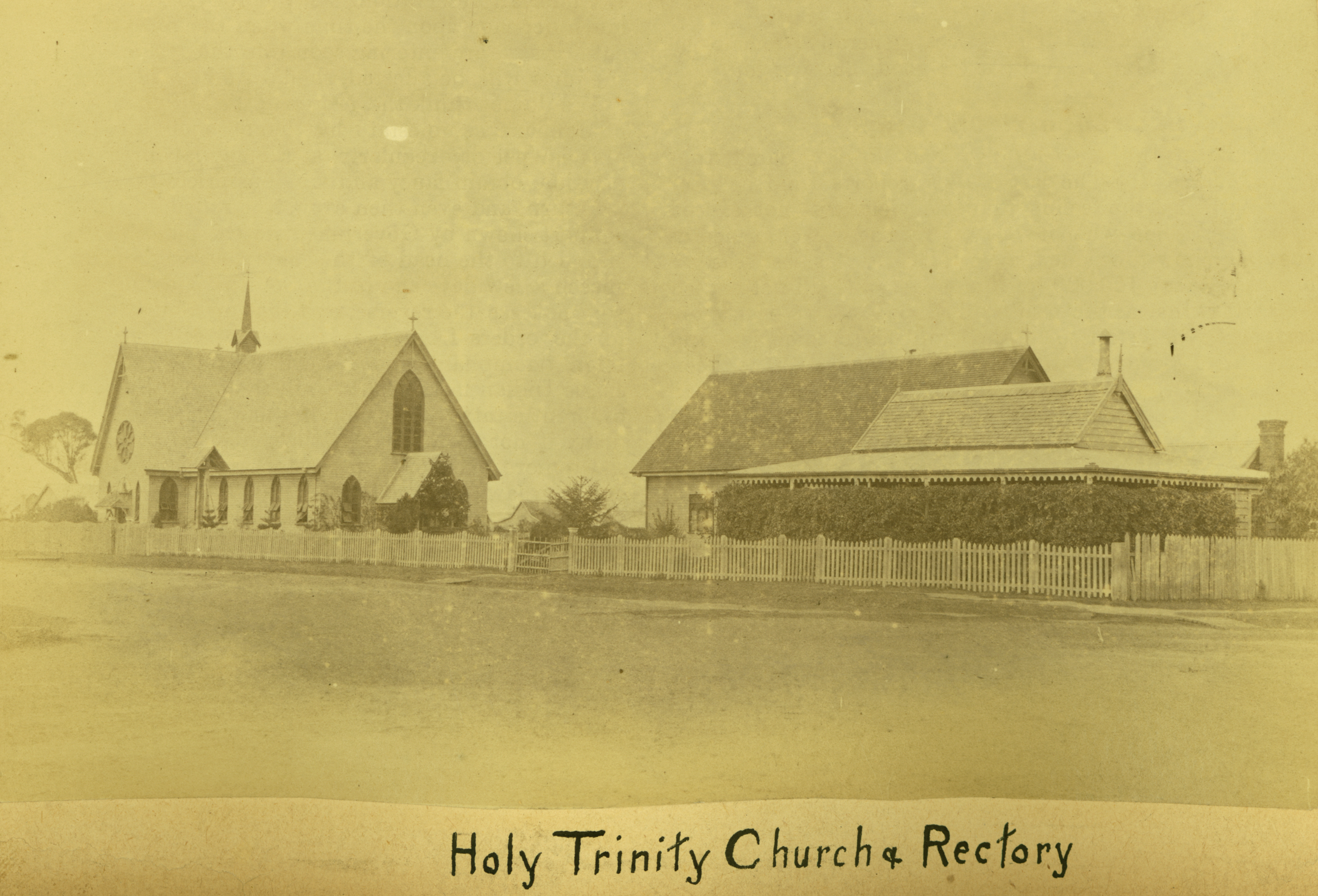
Second Holy Trinity Church and Rectory, circa 1885

Services were held in the Oddfellows' Hall, Sydney Street, until 1879 when a second church was consecrated. By 1884 the Mackay Parish complex consisted of a "large, beautifully appointed Church, a large Sunday School building and a neat cottage for a parsonage". During the late 1880s a ladies' committee was formed to raise funds and this committee contributed £347 towards the cost of a new parsonage. The term "parsonage" became obsolete after 24 years and "rectory" was substituted.

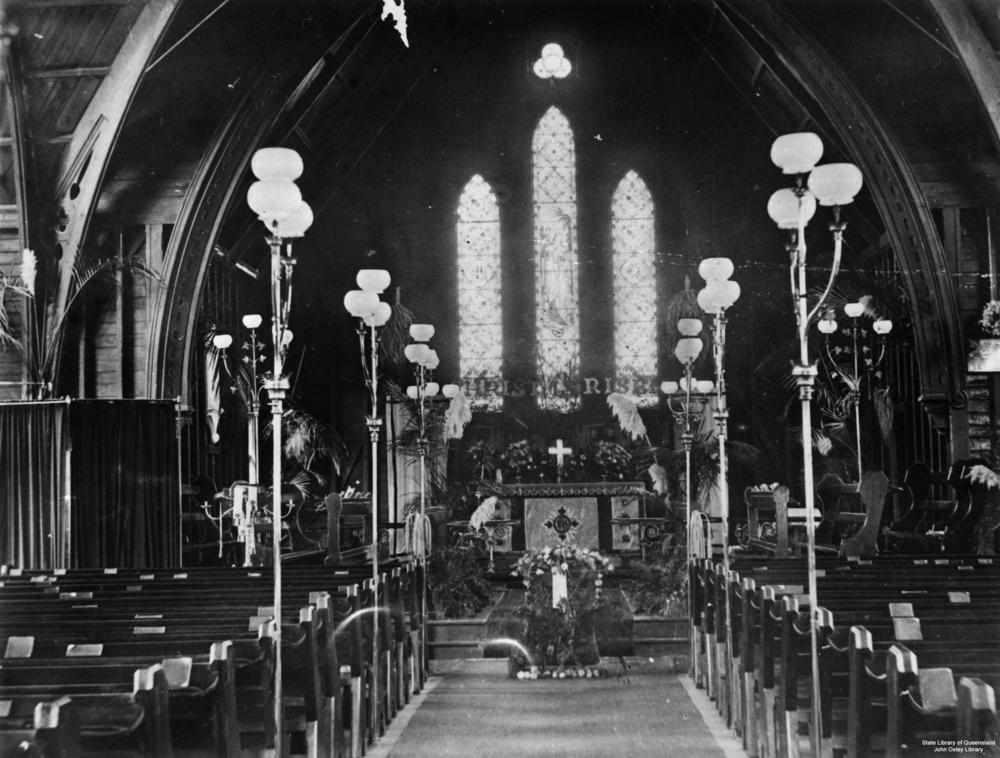
Interior view of the second Holy Trinity Church, 1910

The second Holy Trinity Church was designed by the Queensland Colonial Architect, F D G Stanley, who supplied the plans free of charge. The building was constructed of wood, and was of a Gothic design with a steeply pitched roof covered with shingles, sited on the southern side of the grounds and capable of holding a congregation of 500. This Church was fitted with a pipe organ, an altar of carved English oak, and carved oak rails in memory of prominent people with strong associations with Holy Trinity Parish. Lighting was by gas, with ornate brass standards, about seven feet tall, each surmounted by a cluster of three lamps representing the Trinity.

The second church was destroyed in the 1918 Mackay cyclone. A temporary church was constructed from salvaged timber and a fundraising drive was conducted throughout Australia. In 1923 the estimate for the new building was £10,800 but by time of construction in 1926 the cost had risen to £14,315. This resulted in modifications to the original plan which had included an imposing bell tower, 82 feet (25 m) high and 17 feet (5.2 m) square at the base. The plan also incorporated an arcade which would have been on the east side of the land.

The design of the third church is believed to be similar to that of the Mission Church of the Order of Saint John which was seen by Canon Reginald Halse in Bombay (now Mumbai), India. It suggests the style of a Spanish church with the addition of open verandahs to allow for the harsh northern climate. The incumbent Rector, Canon Fortesque Leo Ash, arranged for a Warriors' Chapel as an integral part of the building in memory of those who had died in World War I. The architect was Lange Leopold Powell and the builders were A Stonage and Sons. The church, together with a rectory and a parish hall occupies a city block. The church was designed in 1923 and completed in 1926.

Lange L Powell was an early twentieth century architect who practised in partnership with Claude Chambers as Chambers and Powell from 1911 until 1920; and then with Beatrice Hutton as Powell and Hutton from 1922 until 1924. When Powell designed the Holy Trinity Church, Mackay he was in private practice. During his long career as an architect Powell designed many prominent buildings, including St Martins Hospital and the Masonic Temple in Ann Street, Brisbane.

In his design of the Holy Trinity Church, Powell used a blend of Romanesque, Spanish Mission and Mediterranean architectural styles, all popular during the inter-war period. A similar eclecticism was used by architect Eric Ford of Brisbane's Chambers and Ford on the design of the Holy Trinity Church at Woolloongabba in Brisbane. The massing and detailing of these two churches illustrates the use of Romanesque architecture which was popularised in America from the late nineteenth century by architect, Henry Hobson Richardson. That the churches are rendered with smooth cast stucco suggests strongly an overriding Spanish Mission influence.

Many of the memorials within the Holy Trinity Church are relics of the first and second churches which were salvaged and incorporated in the present building.

In the mid-1930s the early Rectory was condemned and the hall, built in 1918, required repairs. A new hall was constructed in a style to complement the church and it was proposed that the hall be built large enough for dances, meetings or general entertainment so that rental would pay off the building. The hall had 4000 square feet of floor space, a small hall for kindergarten, Sunday School and rooms for guilds and meetings. The hall was built during 1937–38 and the Rectory, constructed between the church and the hall, was built in 1939. The Queensland Premier William Forgan Smith specifically travelled to Mackay for the opening of the parish hall on 4 September 1937.

The foundation stone for the hall was laid by Premier W Forgan Smith in 1937. The architect was Harold Brown and the contractor was Queensland Engineering. The building was constructed at a cost of £15,000. The Mackay Daily Mercury reported on the 6 September 1937 at the laying of the foundation stone:

"the hope was that the hall would be the centre of culture for the city – physical culture, arts, drama and music – as well as providing rooms for smaller meetings for social, religious, and industrial purposes. The hall would be used a great deal for Church purposes and also for other social occasions that were well run and for the benefit of the people."

The church hall was officially opened by the Bishop of North Queensland, Dr John Feetham, 19 April 1938, at a mask and domino ball reported by the Mackay Daily Mercury as needing little extra in the way of decoration owing to the aesthetic surroundings, but the lighting effects and the outstanding artistry of the interior required nothing in the way of additional support to add to the pleasure of patrons.

The rectory constructed in 1939 between the church and the hall was designed in a style to complement the other buildings. It became a Parish Centre when a new rectory was built in 1974.

The existing church and hall, although not original, remains one of the few building complexes occupying an original site in the district.

== Description ==
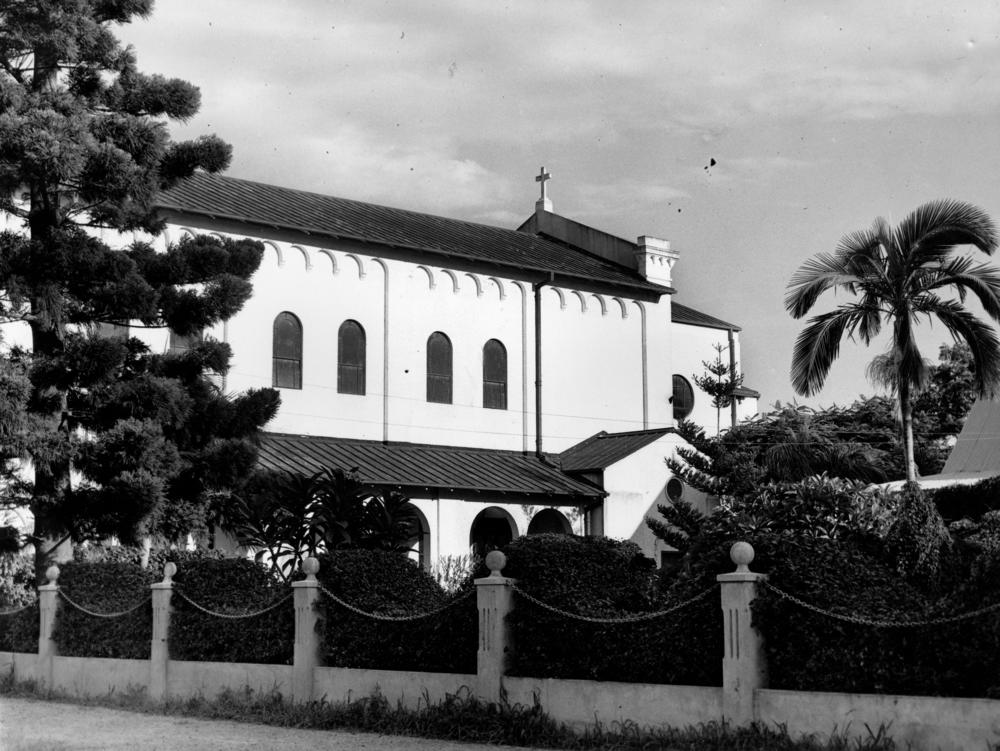
Holy Trinity Church of England in Mackay, 1938

The Holy Trinity Church Complex is located one block south of Victoria Street, the main commercial street of Mackay, on the corner of Gordon and Sydney Streets which is a major thoroughfare through the city.

=== The Church ===
The Holy Trinity Church is a substantial rendered masonry building sited on a north–south axis. The principal facade of the building faces north to Gordon Street. Front elevation has decorative parapet including dentil course and raked arch motif below the eaves line and crucifix finial. A central rose window is filled with coloured and leaded glass panel. The entry is defined by an arched gabled entry portico with twisted "barley sugar" columns. The exterior is rendered with smooth white stucco. The gabled roof of the building is clad with red painted wide gauge corrugated iron roof which simulates terra cotta tiles. Along the outside of the nave is an arcaded arched colonnade loggia.

The interior of the building comprises a nave with the aisles surmounted by clerestory lighting. Lining the side elevations of the church are round-arched window openings. The clerestory windows are in pairs and filled with coloured glass. Below are glazed doors in geometrical patterned coloured glass.

The interior is also rendered with white stucco and has a cruciform plan. In one transept is the Warriors' chapel with three stained glass windows of St George, St Michael and St Alban. This chapel is divided form the body of the church through three round arched openings. At the rear is an organ loft on four columns. The ceiling is vaulted, with cross vaults at the bays of the engaged piers.

There are many memorials within the church, including several retrieved from earlier churches on the site. There is also a cedar Bishop's throne which could also be from an earlier church. The sanctuary arch is flanked by marble Corinthian columns. A simple marble altar sits within the half domes space of the sanctuary.

=== The Residence ===
The residence is between the other buildings, set back from the street screened by a tropical garden. The residence is also rendered with white stucco and has a decorative front parapet, and a group of three round arch windows on the principal elevation. The roof is clad with red corrugated iron. Stepped fronted residence, gabled roof apart from the front parapet. The interior includes chevron decorative ceilings.

=== Parish Hall ===
The front of the Hall faces north to Gordon Street. A foundation stone is at front of the building. The hall is a rectangular building on the same orientation as the church, north–south axis, but slightly larger. It too is rendered with white stucco and has decorative parapets repeating the raked arched motif of the church. The parapets are capped with terra-cotta tiles.

The front facade has a central projecting bay, with a group of three archways at the entrance. Above is a group of three arched windows housed within a large round arched recess .

Up several steps is a reception lobby with terrazzo floor, with small meeting rooms either side. Stairs to either side lead to further rooms upstairs. Through the three entrance doors with brass handles, is a large hall, of two-storey height. Centred is a dance floor. The hall area presently has a suspended ceiling and a mezzanine over its rear section. Along each side of the hall is an arched colonnaded aisle, with a mezzanine walkway to the perimeter. In some parts, there are large round-arched windows rising the two-storeys of the height. Below the stage is a basement with framed change cubicles.

== Heritage listing ==
Holy Trinity Church Complex was listed on the Queensland Heritage Register on 29 April 2003 having satisfied the following criteria.

The place is important in demonstrating the evolution or pattern of Queensland's history.

The Holy Trinity Church complex is a substantial brick complex which is important in demonstrating the growth and importance of Mackay associated with the sugar cane industry from 1864 to the present time.

The place is important because of its aesthetic significance.

The Holy Trinity Church Complex comprises three buildings constructed at different times all with reference to and in sympathy with the distinctive Romanesque inspired design of the 1923 Church. The Complex is a landmark in Mackay and has aesthetic and architectural significance for its siting, planning, quality of detailing and other design qualities. The Church is of particular architectural quality, with well composed interiors and detailing, and has special associations with the architect Lange Powell, in illustrating the breadth of this work.

The place has a strong or special association with a particular community or cultural group for social, cultural or spiritual reasons.

It has a long association with the Anglican community in Mackay.

The place has a special association with the life or work of a particular person, group or organisation of importance in Queensland's history.

The church demonstrates the spread of the Anglican Church in regional Queensland.
