= Austral Motors Building =

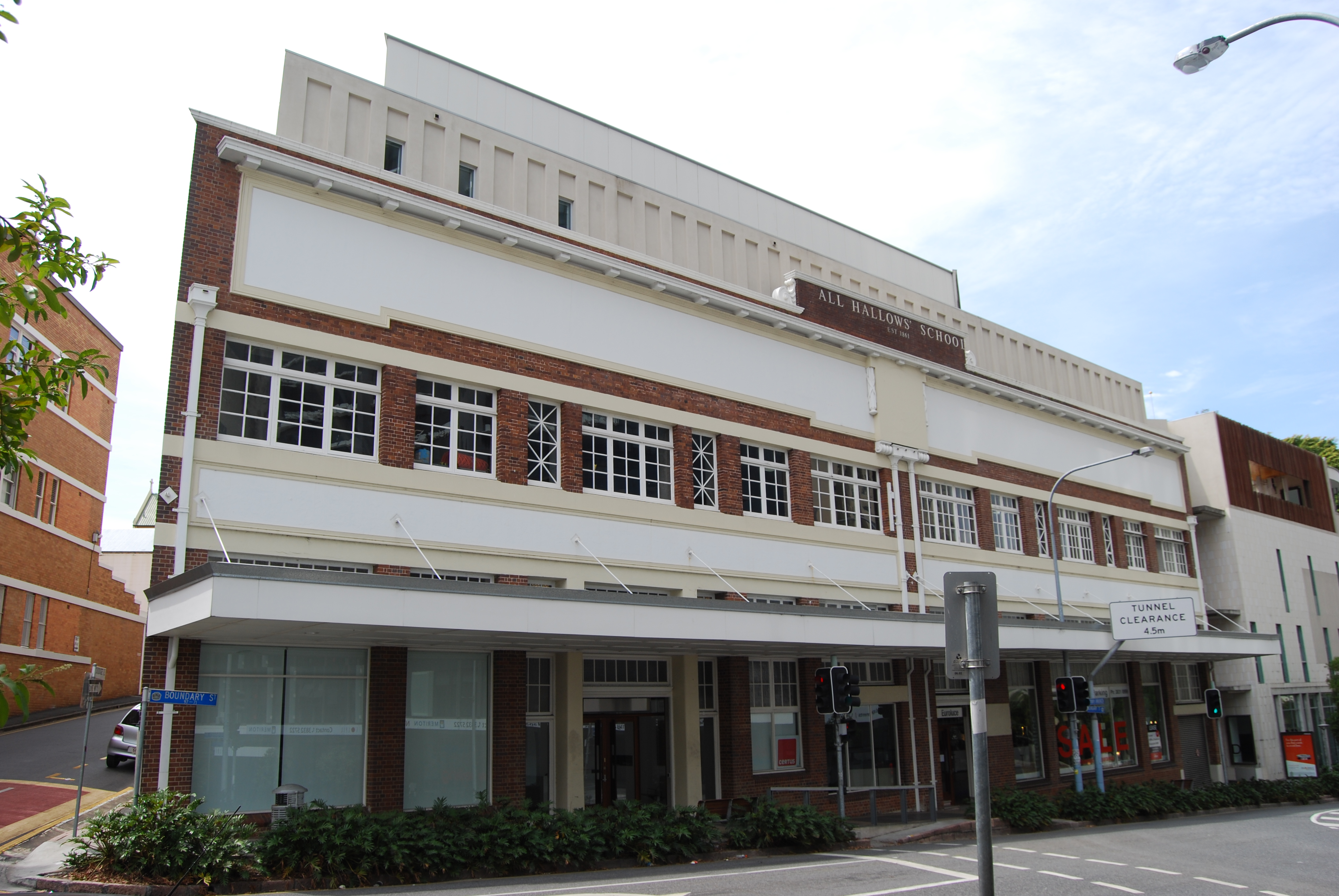
- Austral Motors Building, 2012

- Location within Queensland Location within Australia
- 27.4617°S 153.0327°E
- Location: 95 Boundary Street, Fortitude Valley, City of Brisbane, Queensland, Australia

History
- Design period: 1919–1930s (interwar period)
- Built: 1923–25

Site notes
- Architect(s): Lange Leopold Powell, George Gerald Hutton

Queensland Heritage Register
- Official name: Austral Motors Building (former)
- Type: state heritage (built)
- Designated: 11 April 2005
- Reference no.: 602505
- Significant period: 1920s (fabric); 1923–86 (historical use)
- Significant components: workshop, showroom
- Builders: Blair Cunningham

Austral Motors Building is a heritage-listed former automobile showroom at 95 Boundary Street, Fortitude Valley, City of Brisbane, Queensland, Australia. It was designed by Lange Leopold Powell and George Gerald Hutton and built from 1923 to 1925 by Blair Cunningham. It was added to the Queensland Heritage Register on 11 April 2005.

== History ==
The former Austral Motors Building, which closes the vista at the end of Upper Adelaide Street, Petrie Bight, is located on the Fortitude Valley side of Boundary Street at the northern end of the Brisbane central business district. Constructed in 1924–6 for the Austral Motors Company, it has a close association with the 20th century interwar re-development of the Petrie Bight area as an important warehousing precinct and motor vehicle servicing and distribution district.

Petrie Bight is a sharp curve in the Brisbane River at the northern end of the Town Reach. The name is derived from the association of the area with early Brisbane builder Andrew Petrie, who c. 1838 established his workshop and residence at the corner of Wharf and Queen Streets.

=== Early Petrie Bight land use ===
Surveyor Henry Wade, on his 1844 Map of the Environs of Brisbane Town, identified the Petrie's Bight area south of Boundary Street and east of Queen Street as "Reserved for Dry Dock". Surveyor Galloway did the same on his 1856 Plan of the Suggested Extension of the Town of Brisbane. At this time the surrounding area was sparsely occupied, with Andrew Petrie's house and factory at the corner of Wharf and Queen Streets; Dr Hobbs' house (now St John's Deanery) a little further north in Adelaide Street; the original Customs House in Queen Street, beside the Brisbane River; and a ferry jetty just north of the Customs Houses.

A c. 1860 map of Brisbane Town showing the new town boundaries no longer labelled Petrie's Bight as a reserve for a dry dock (no dry dock was ever established there), but the site remained unsurveyed Government land. An early track (the northern end of Queen Street) ran through this land, branching off in three directions to New Farm, Fortitude Valley and the northwest end of Spring Hollow.

Under the provisions of the Brisbane Gas Company Bill 1864 the Queensland Government granted to the Company a site bounded by what are now Ann, Boundary and Macrossan streets and a 160-metre (520 ft) frontage to the Brisbane River, as the site for Brisbane's first gas works. This was the northern half of the Government land at Petrie's Bight. Gas production commenced there in 1865, providing the Brisbane Municipal Council with a regular supply of gas for street lighting. By the early 1870s the demand for gas for domestic consumption was outstripping supply, and in the mid-1870s a second gasometer was constructed on the site. In 1873 the Brisbane Gas Company gained a formal deed of grant to the Petrie's Bight land, an area of 4 acres (1.6 ha) 17.5 perches (440 m^{2}), which the Company had purchased from the Government in May 1873 for £4,300.

An April 1873 a survey plan titled Survey of Site of Gas Works and Adjacent Crown Land Shewing Road Through Same indicates that by this date the gas works site was fenced along the entire length of its land boundaries, but that through this the government had just surveyed a 20-foot (6.1 m) wide road between Macrossan and Boundary streets, which later became an extension of Adelaide Street. Photographs from the 1860s and early 1870s show a tall paling fence around the perimeter of the gas works, prohibiting public access. Early Brisbane resident Victor Drury, writing in The Courier-Mail in 1939, recalled: "When Adelaide Street was extended to Boundary Street, there were turnstiles there, and only pedestrians could use the path as a short cut to Queen Street."

=== River wharfage ===
In the early 1840s wharfage in Brisbane was concentrated along the South Brisbane Reach of the Brisbane River, but within a decade had extended to the Town Reach further downstream, which soon rivalled South Brisbane in terms of shipping activity. An 1849 decision to locate Brisbane's first purpose-built Customs House at the northern end of the Town Reach acted as the impetus for the development of wharves on this part of the river. The Commissariat Store below William Street, which had served as Brisbane's first customs facility, was replaced in 1850 by a new customs building on the site of the present Customs House, Brisbane in Queen Street, at Petrie's Bight. (This in turn was replaced in 1886–89 by the current building.) During the 1850s and 1860s, a number of shipping companies and private investors constructed wharves and warehouses between the Customs House and Alice Street, near the City Botanic Gardens.

Construction of a Government wharf (Kennedy Wharf) at Petrie's Bight north of the Customs House commenced in 1875 was completed in 1877 and was leased to private shipping firms. In 1880 the Brisbane Municipal Council acquired the wharf and immediately extended it northward. In 1884 the Council also constructed a wharf at the end of Boundary Street, and in the mid-1880s William Collin established his own wharf at Petrie's Bight, just downstream from the Council's Boundary Street wharf. Purchase of land from the Brisbane Gas Company in 1902 gave the Council control of the river frontage from the Customs House to Boundary Street, and between 1913 and 1916 the Council constructed reinforced concrete wharves between Macrossan and Boundary Streets, and between Kennedy Wharf and the Customs House. The whole of the Council's wharfage at Petrie's Bight was subsequently renamed Circular Quay Wharves.

Between 1900 and 1912 Brisbane Wharves Ltd established wharves at Petrie's Bight from Boundary Street to Bowen Terrace, rivalling the Council's Circular Quay facilities in importance. Principal investors in the Brisbane Wharf Company were Howard Smith and William Collin and Sons. From the late 1890s, Howard Smith and Company Ltd occupied the Council's Boundary Street Wharf at Petrie's Bight and in the early years of the 20th century leased the adjacent new wharves constructed by Brisbane Wharves Limited at the base of the New Farm cliffs, below Bowen Terrace. These wharves were extended in the 1920s, and in the 1930s were resumed by the Queensland government for the construction of the Story Bridge.

=== Adelaide Street widening ===
In the early 20th century the roads to Petrie's Bight were improved significantly by the Brisbane City Council, providing an important impetus for the construction of new warehouses in the Upper Adelaide Street area.

Under the provisions of the City of Brisbane Improvement Act 1916 and the Local Authorities Act Amendment Act 1923 the Brisbane City Council contributed significantly to the 1920s building boom, with a programme of city beautification and street improvements, including the cutting down and widening of several of the principal thoroughfares. The 1916 Act empowered the City Council, with the approval of the Governor-in-Council, to resume land simply by passing a resolution to the effect that resumption was necessary. Property rights on resumed lands were then converted into compensation rights. The 1923 Act further facilitated this process by exempting all improvements made to a property after resumption notices had been issued, from the payment of compensation.

From 1923 to 1928 the Brisbane City Council implemented its most ambitious town improvement scheme to that date: the widening of Adelaide Street by 14 feet (4.3 m) along its entire length. Resumptions in Adelaide Street had commenced in the 1910s, but work on the street widening did not take place until the 1920s. The work was undertaken in stages, commencing in 1923 at the southern end where the new Brisbane City Hall was under construction. Some buildings had the front section removed and a contemporary facade installed on the new road alignment. Elsewhere, earlier buildings were demolished and substantial new structures took their place. At the northern end of Adelaide Street the cutting down of the hill below St John's Cathedral in 1928 facilitated greater access to Petrie Bight, which, close to new city wharves at the end of Boundary Street, boomed in the 1920s as a warehousing district.

By 1921 Queensland was poised to resume the economic boom interrupted by the First World War (1914–18). In the period 1922–1928, Queensland experienced its first and last economic boom between the outbreak of war in 1914 and the 1950s. The benefits of the boom economy were reflected throughout the State, but nowhere more so than in Brisbane, with 29% of the Queensland population in December 1924. In physical terms the boom was expressed in a spate of building activity that transported the central business district of Brisbane into the 20th century, shedding its late Victorian image.

The take-off in the building industry was evident during 1922–23, reflected in an active central business district real estate market, and prompting the Brisbane City Council to re-assess central city rateable values in 1923. By September 1925 property in Queen Street, the principal retail and financial street of Brisbane, could be acquired only at highly inflated prices, forcing investors into more peripheral locations such as Petrie's Bight. A fall in the price of building materials, combined with the trend in using concrete, a more economical product than brick, for large construction projects, further stimulated building activity.

From 1922 the business of re-building Brisbane assumed impressive proportions. Between 1923 and 1925, an average of 50 new commercial buildings a year were being constructed in Brisbane, contrasting markedly with the 8 constructed twenty years earlier in 1903. During 1925 the value of contracts for buildings in Brisbane, either in course of erection or in contemplation, was reported at £3,000,000. The Greater Brisbane City Council meticulously monitored progress through its building approvals process, statistics for which were released monthly from October 1925 to an eager local press. Construction peaked in 1926 with £3,411,285 worth of building works (new buildings, alterations and additions) approved in the Greater Brisbane area during the year. This included a substantial residential component. In 1927 the figure was around £2,823,000 and in 1928 just over £2,810,000.

=== The motor car industry ===
In the 1910s the increasing availability of motor vehicles began to revolutionise public, private and commercial transport. In Brisbane, activities associated with horse transport began to convert to activities associated with motor transport, as coach and carriage builders became motor vehicle repairers or retailers, and livery stables became parking and service stations. In this way, the Austral Carriage Works, established around 1907 by Uhlmann and Lane at 51 Adelaide Street, Brisbane, entered the motor trade shortly after the First World War. Austral Motors Limited became the sole agents in Queensland and the Northern Rivers for Dodge Brothers, an American firm that had manufactured motor cars since 1914 and light trucks since 1917. They were successful and by 1924 had two branches, with the Austral Carriage & Motor Works at Stanley Street in South Brisbane, and Austral Motors Distributors at Boundary Street, Spring Hill.

Queenslanders adopted motor vehicles with enthusiasm. Of the six Australian states, Queensland recorded the third largest number of motor vehicle registrations, 31,233, in 1923–24, behind New South Wales and Victoria. At the international level in 1923–24, Australia, with approximately 274,000 motor vehicle registrations, was fifth behind France (545,000), Canada (666,000), the United Kingdom (1,085,000), and the United States (15,400,000), and well ahead of Germany, in sixth place with 211,500 registrations.

Through the daily press, Brisbanites were exposed to a barrage of advertising from the motor vehicle industry, with regular features on aspects of motors and motoring. To accommodate this explosion of public interest in, and acceptance of, the motor vehicle, the number of Brisbane motor engineers' agents, car manufacturers, car importers, and garages listed in the local postal directories increased from 89 in 1920–21, to 134 in 1924–25. This was accompanied by a corresponding increase in the number of motor vehicle accessory dealers, windscreen manufacturers, tyre dealers and motorcar body manufacturers.

By September 1925, the Brisbane City Council was raising the problem of providing parking for motor vehicles in the inner city. Purpose-built privately operated parking stations began to appear in the central business district from the mid-1920s. Numerous small garages and service stations also provided motor vehicle parking and car hire.

From the mid-1920s, Australia's premier building and architectural trade journal, the Sydney publication Building, had printed articles on designing public and commercial buildings to accommodate motor vehicles. Much of the journal's reference material came from the United States, which was leading the way in this type of design. Queensland architects had ready access to this and other architectural journals, and kept informed of the latest in international design developments.

In 1923 Austral Motors Limited engaged Brisbane architects Lange Leopold Powell and George Gerald Hutton to design a showroom and service station at Petrie Bight. The land on which the Austral Motors building was constructed was part of two larger parcels of land first alienated from the Crown in 1852 and was surveyed and subdivided, together with the adjacent lane, in April 1923. The new road, Dodge Lane, was approved in May 1923 and is believed to have derived its name from the firm's Dodge agency. Tenders for construction were let in August 1923, the successful tenderer being Blair Cunningham. The first stage, on the corner of Dodge Lane, was completed in March 1924 at a projected cost of £9,300 and occupied by Austral Motors Limited from 1 April 1924. The two-storeyed building was constructed largely of concrete and steel, with a floor space of approximately 20,000 square feet (1,900 m^{2}). Due to the slope of the land, both floors had street access. The Boundary Street level accommodated a motor vehicle show room. The upper level, accessed off Dodge Lane at the rear, was fitted out as the Dodge Brothers Service Station.

In 1925 the firm undertook substantial extensions to their premises. George Hutton, who briefly occupied the position of Queensland Government Architect in 1922 prior to joining Powell in partnership in 1922, established his own practice in 1924, and called tenders for site excavations for Austral Motors Ltd in late 1924, the contract being let by January 1925. By April 1925 William Richard Juster's tender for additions and alterations to Austral Motors Ltd. had been accepted, but this appears not to have progressed, for by June 1925 Blair Cunningham's tender for the additions had been accepted. In July 1925 Austral Motors Ltd obtained Brisbane City Council approval for the construction, to cost £10,230.

The location was an excellent choice for a business of this type, being close to the city's main wharves at Petrie Bight, and in a location favoured by other motor vehicle retailers and ancillary businesses. The Evers Motor Co. Ltd had established a garage/paint shop at the eastern corner of Ivory and Boundary streets as early as c. 1918, and by 1920 HS Simpson, motor painter, was located next door to Evers. About 1926/27 Evers constructed a three-storeyed brick motor shed, offices and workshops at the corner of Boundary and Ivory streets, and a single-storeyed brick parking and filling station adjacent in Ivory Street, known as the Super Parking Station. As warehousing activity in Upper Adelaide Street expanding during the 1920s, many buildings were occupied by firms connected with the motor vehicle trade and industry and with car hire and garaging. In 1928, Collin House, a purpose-designed parking station and garage and a four-storey brick warehouse for the Dunlop Rubber Company of Australasia Pty Ltd were constructed in the vicinity. Tyre sales, automotive electricians and spare parts suppliers formed a substantial proportion of tenants in buildings in upper Adelaide Street during the 1920s and 1930s.

In the second half of the 1920s Austral Motors expanded rapidly, due to the Queensland-wide economic boom that coincided with the increasing availability of and public interest in motor vehicles. By 1929 the company was operating from several addresses and two cities, with the Austral Carriage & Motor Works continuing at Stanley Street, South Brisbane; Austral Cars Ltd established at Adelaide Street, Brisbane; and Austral Motors Ltd located at Boundary St, Spring Hill and at Sturt Street, Townsville.

In 1939 Austral Motors Pty Ltd acquired title to the allotment along the eastern boundary of the Company's mid-1920s acquisitions.

In 1986 Austral Motors sold the property to the Sisters of Mercy in Queensland who own the adjacent All Hallows girls' school. It continues its connection with motor vehicles and is leased out as a parking station as well as being used to park vehicles of All Hallows staff.

== Description ==
A two-storey red face brick former motor showroom and workshop, the former Austral Motors Building occupies land on the ridge formed by Boundary Street at the north end of Adelaide Street. The site is bounded by Boundary Street on the south, Dodge Lane on the west, and adjacent allotments on the east and north.

Large fixed glass display windows (some now boarded up) in the Boundary Street shopfront take advantage of the approaching slope of Adelaide Street to feature the showroom to maximum effect. The building is also notable for the banks of windows that throw light into the showroom and workshop areas. Decorated with an applied white cement rendered panel with a dentilled cornice and a decorative central tablet, the parapet front to Boundary Street screens a double gable roof clad with corrugated metal sheeting. Tucked within the base of the tablet, a narrow rectangular rainwater head and downpipes drain the central box gutter of the roof. Banks of large timber framed casement windows with fanlights run across the upper storey of the front elevation, lighting the front of the workshop/office area of the upper storey. This fenestration is enlivened with the inclusion of a number of decorative windows with a pattern of radiating lights. A cantilevered awning projects over the footpath to Boundary Street sheltering the showroom shopfronts. Two roller door entrances provide vehicle access from Boundary Street to the showrooms. The pedestrian entrance off Boundary Street is boarded up.

The ground floor accommodates two spacious showrooms with high ceilings clad in fibrous cement panelling with timber cover strips, which are stained dark to provide a decorative contrast in the western section. The ceiling is supported by steel posts and beams clad with timber sheeting and embellished with decorative timber mouldings. The showroom to the west side is floored towards the front with red brown terrazzo, presumably to display cars to the best advantage. This area is notable for a pair of steel lattice trusses, which support the concrete floor above, and has stairs to the upper storey that are no longer in use.

Windows to the south, east and west light the upper storey, which also has a battened ceiling, though the central section is missing. This workshop level has two large entrances to each side of the building. The floor is concrete to the part of the workshop accessed by the west entrance; the balance of the floor is timber. The east opening accommodates a pair of substantial timber sliding doors. This level has offices and toilets and an enquiry counter near the rear entrance that opens on to a yard accessed from Antrim Street and Dodge Lane. The red face brick double gable parapet of the rear elevation screens the two gable roofs behind. An open lean-to-roof shelter projects out from north end of the building.

The Dodge Lane elevation in red face brick houses banks of timber framed casement windows with fanlights to both storeys. A solid timber sliding door to the middle of the elevation provides entry to the showroom level and access to the timber stair to the upper storey. A narrow rectangular fixed glass window is to the north side of this entrance. Lintels and sills are distinguished in rendered cement.

== Heritage listing ==
The former Austral Motors Building was listed on the Queensland Heritage Register on 11 April 2005 having satisfied the following criteria.

The place is important in demonstrating the evolution or pattern of Queensland's history.

The former Austral Motors Building, erected in two stages 1923–25 as a purpose-designed motor vehicle show room and service depot, is important in demonstrating the pattern of Queensland's history, in particular the Queensland-wide economic boom of the 1920s which transformed the appearance of the Brisbane central business district. During this period roads were straightened, widened and levelled; motorised vehicles congested inner city roads; the 19th-century building stock was replaced by substantial brick or concrete commercial premises, many of which were designed around the motor car, such as parking stations and garages and motor show rooms; and most of the vacant land in the city centre was rapidly improved with substantial new brick buildings. At this period the Upper Adelaide Street district at Petrie Bight was developed as an important warehousing precinct, the development being facilitated by early 20th century initiatives of the Brisbane City Council, which included: constructing a formal wide road network, graded for motorised vehicular transport; encouraging the establishment of service lanes and alleys to allow for pedestrian and vehicle access to commercial buildings; and providing extensive new wharfage nearby at Circular Quay.

In particular, the former Austral Motors Building is important in illustrating the strong association of the Petrie Bight district with the early expansion of the motor vehicle trade in Queensland. Most of the warehouses in the area accommodated tenants or owners associated with the motor vehicle trade (including distribution, repairs and the provision of parts) or with motor vehicle servicing and parking.

The place demonstrates rare, uncommon or endangered aspects of Queensland's cultural heritage.

The former Austral Motors Building is an early, rare surviving and intact purpose-designed mid-1920s motor show room and service station.

The place is important in demonstrating the principal characteristics of a particular class of cultural places.

The former Austral Motors Building (1923–25) remains highly intact and is important in demonstrating the principal characteristics of a large, state-of-the-art motor vehicle show room of the interwar period. Its role as a sales and service facility is demonstrated by the spacious show rooms and the garaging facility at the rear for the servicing and maintenance of motor vehicles.

The place is important in illustrating the commercial work of leading Brisbane architects of the interwar period, Lange Powell and George Hutton, expressing the commercial priorities of the time.
