= Victor S. Drury =

- Born: February 24, 1825
- Died: January 21, 1918 (aged 92)

Victor S. Drury (1825–1918) was a labor leader and libertarian socialist. He was a co-author of The Pittsburgh Manifesto to the Workingmen of America.
