= Battle axe block =

L-shaped block of land

A diagram of a battle axe block as seen from above. Lot 1 is a regular plot of land while Lot 2 is the corresponding battle axe block located behind it.

In real estate, a battle axe block, hammerhead block, hatchet block or flagpole block is a block of land situated behind another, with access to the street through a narrow driveway shared by both properties. They are named for their distinct L-shape, which is said to look like a battle axe, hammer, hatchet or flagpole from above. Battle axe blocks are often the result of property developers subdividing a long block of land widthwise, with the rear section becoming a battle axe block.
