= Masonic Temple, Brisbane =

Heritage-listed building in Brisbane, Queensland

Masonic Temple
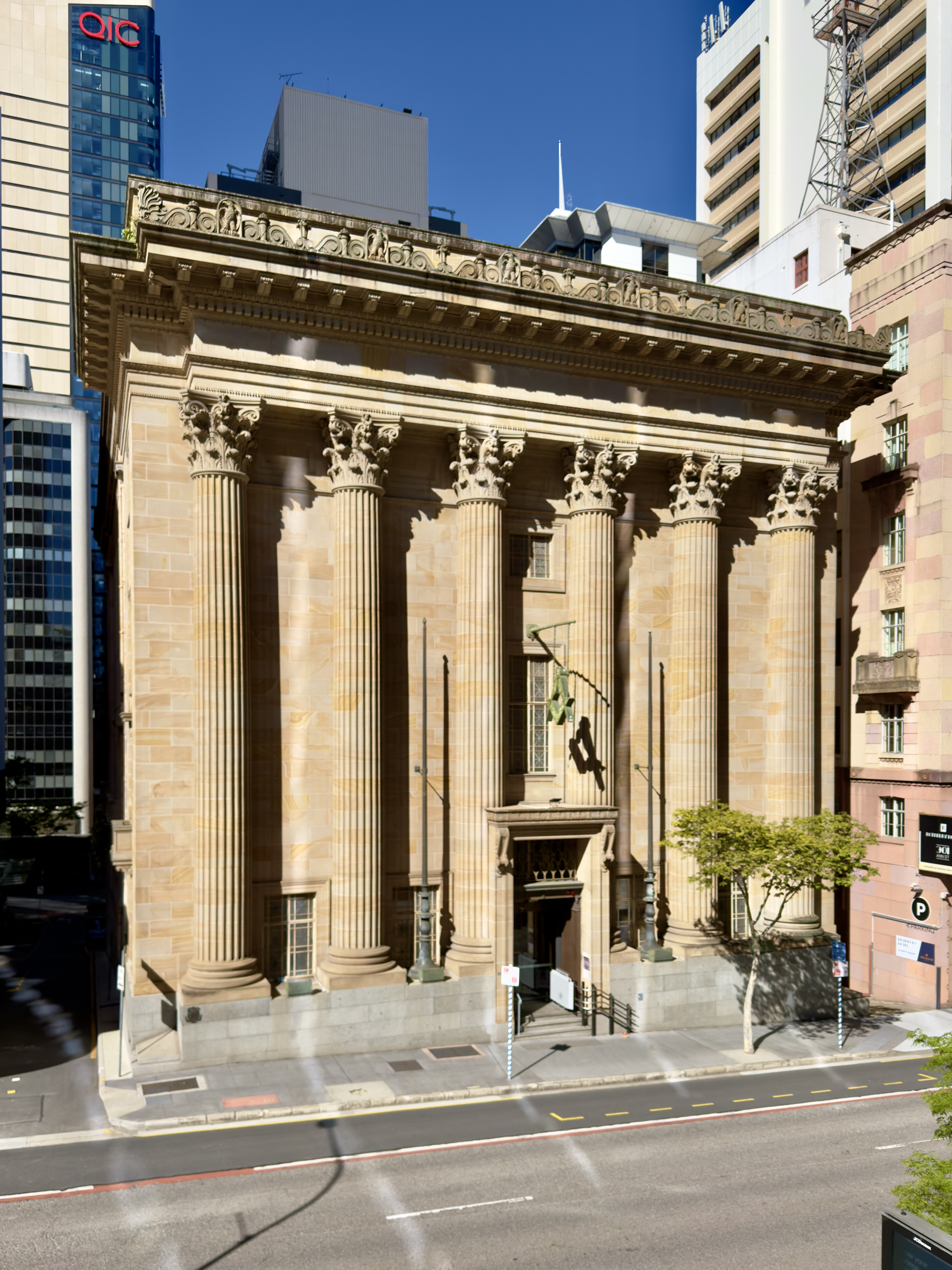
- Masonic Memorial Temple, Brisbane

- Location within Queensland
- 27.4652°S 153.0281°E
- Location: 311 Ann Street, Brisbane City, City of Brisbane, Queensland, Australia

History
- Design period: 1919–1930s (Interwar period)
- Built: 25 April 1928 – 1930

Site notes
- Architect: Lange Leopold Powell of Atkinson, Powell and Conrad
- Architectural style: Classical Revival

Queensland Heritage Register
- Official name: Masonic Temple
- Type: state heritage
- Designated: 21 October 1992
- Reference no.: 600074
- Type: Social and community: Hall-masonic / lodge / friendly or benefit society
- Theme: Creating social and cultural institutions: Organisations and societies; Creating social and cultural institutions: Commemorating significant events
- Builders: George Alexander Stronach & Son

The Masonic Temple is a heritage-listed masonic temple at 311 Ann Street, Brisbane City, City of Brisbane, Queensland, Australia. It was designed by Lange Leopold Powell of Atkinson, Powell and Conrad and was built from 1928 to 1930 by George Alexander Stronach & Son. It is also known as the Masonic Memorial Temple. It was added to the Queensland Heritage Register on 21 October 1992.

== History ==
The Masonic Temple was constructed between 1928 and 1930. In April 1921 the United Grand Lodge of Queensland was formed by the union of the 281 Freemasons' lodges in Queensland. To commemorate the union the Grand Lodge agreed to construct a centrally located temple. In December 1921 land in Ann Street, with a 77-foot (23 m) frontage and depth of 148 feet (45 m), was purchased. In December 1922 an additional 6.3 perches (160 m^{2}) was acquired to make the site symmetrical. The total cost of the land was £6 874.

In June 1923 a competition was held to produce a design for the temple. On 8 December 1924 the plans of Lange Powell (a freemason) of Atkinson, Powell and Conrad, were chosen from the 16 entries submitted. Tenders were called on 12 March 1928 but the plans were drastically modified. The tender of £101,171 from Messrs George Alexander Stronach and Son, builders, was accepted.

On Anzac Day (25 April) 1928 the Most Worshipful Brother Justice Charles Stumm laid the foundation stone. A time capsule was placed beneath the stone which contained copies of the 4 metropolitan newspapers of 24 April 1928, duplicate cheques contributed by Lodges and Brethren, a copy of the Grand Master's speech and coins. The construction of the Masonic Temple commenced in May 1928. The temple was completed in 1930 at a cost of £103 000, plus £10 000 for furniture. Freemasons throughout Queensland contributed towards the expense.

The design provided a four storey building, with a basement for the caretaker and storerooms. The ground floor held the executive offices of the Grand Lodges of Queensland, a library and a museum. In the centre of the large circular vestibule was the Urn of Remembrance to Brethren who died in the First World War. The first floor comprised supper rooms and the second held the lodge rooms. The Grand Lodge room, approximately 91 by 71 by 32 feet (27.7 by 21.6 by 9.8 m), on the top floor, seated 1100 people, and was described in the Architecture and Building Journal in February 1928 as the "largest and finest of its kind in Australia".

The total cost of the project summed up to £130,000 which included £7,000 for the land and £10,000 for furniture. Although the cost of the project was considered somewhat high, it was constructed to be able to take three more floors when this became necessary.

On 9 December 1930 Sir John Goodwin, Governor of Queensland, unveiled and dedicated the memorial urn and on 10 December 1930 the Temple was opened by Most Worshipful Grand Master (Brother William Herbert Green) and dedicated as a memorial to fallen Brethren, a symbol of Masonic unity in Queensland and as a monument to Freemasonry in Queensland. Since 1930 the hall has been the centre of Masonic activity in Queensland.

== Description ==
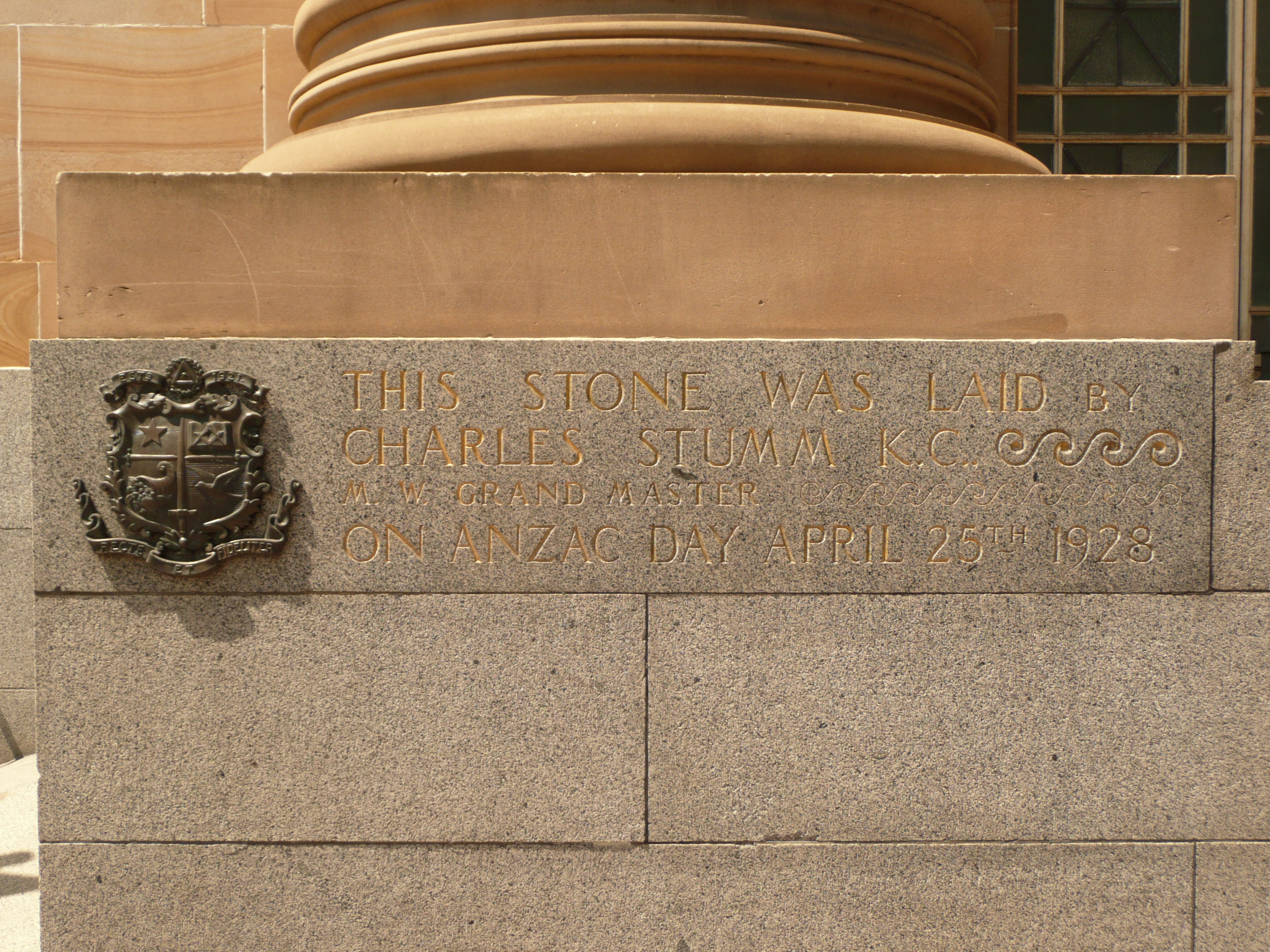
Foundation stone laid on Anzac Day, 25 April 1928

The Masonic Temple located in upper Ann Street is built in the Classical Revival style. It is rectangular in plan form with its short elevation facing Ann Street. The front facade features six fluted giant order Corinthian columns, each five feet in diameter at the base, supporting a rich entablature and pediment. Between the two central columns are leadlight steel framed windows and the main entry door at the base of the building. The sliding entry doors are bronze and heavily studded. In the bays between columns to either side of the entry are two bronze flagstaffs. The lower portion of the front is a grey granite base containing the foundation stone. The rest of the building has a concrete frame structure encased with both brick and sandstone. The front facade above the granite base is sandstone from Yangan. The initial structure was designed to allow for the possible addition of extra storeys at a future date.

The position of the entrance door was described as "unfortunate" as it cuts into the columns rather than coming between them. Internally on the ground floor level directly behind the entrance is the Hall of Remembrance with its central Urn of Remembrance mounted on a black marble base surrounded by eight free-standing Tuscan columns arranged in a circle with a star-shaped pattern on the floor. The offices, library and museum open off the circular vestibule.

Above the ground floor is the first floor with lodge rooms arranged around a central corridor, and on the second floor above there are supper rooms arranged in a similar fashion.

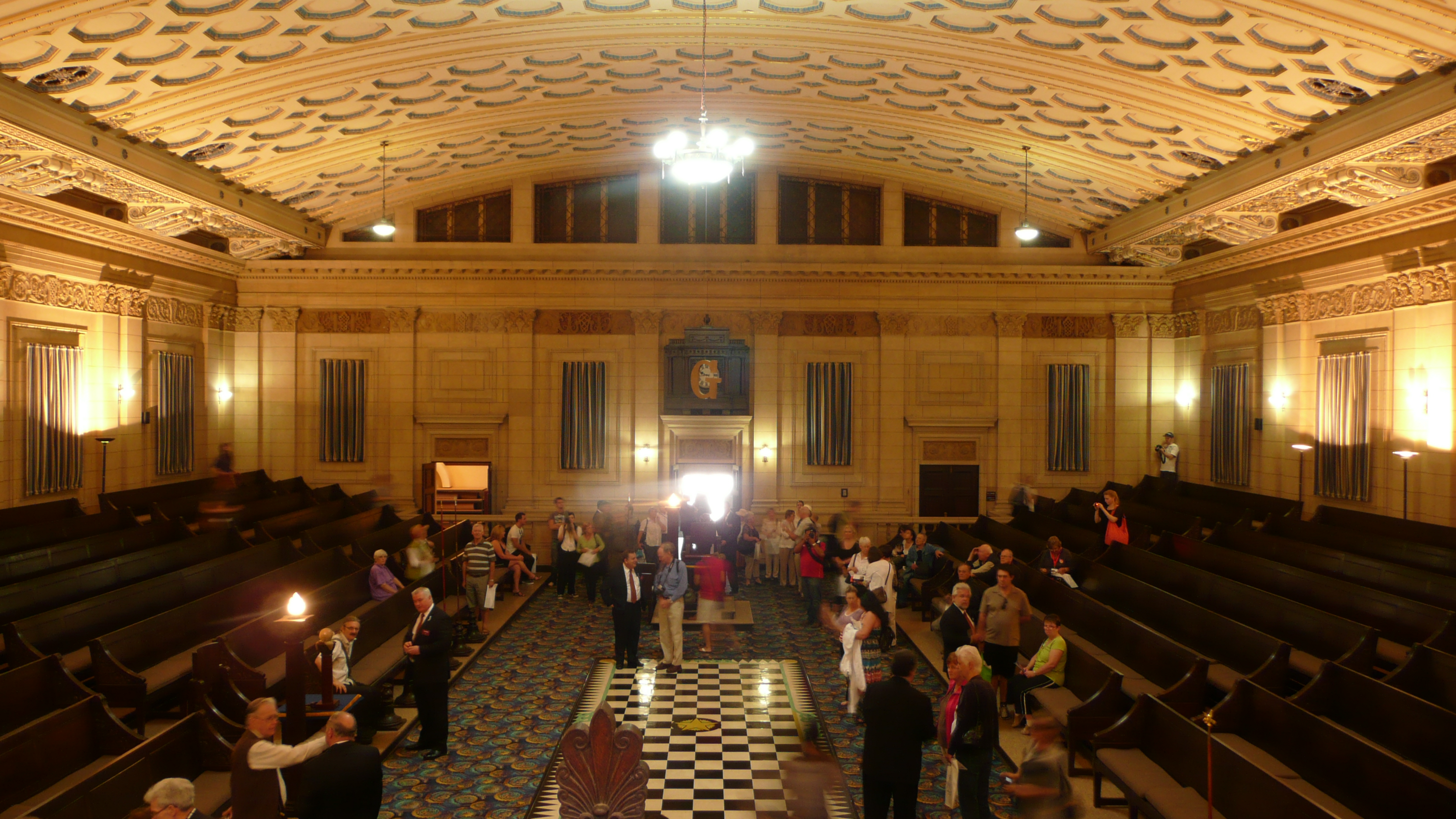
Grand Hall, 2011

The third (top) floor mainly taken up by the Grand Hall, a large symmetrical open space with a vaulted coffered ceiling and stepped seating facing the centre. The interior walls have been rendered and given a sand float to give the appearance of sandstone and are surrounded by evenly spaced paired Corinthian pilasters. The organ chamber claims twenty eight feet of this floor space and the pipe organ was supplied by Messrs. B.B. Whitehouse and company. In front of the organ chamber is a gallery seating twenty-two choir members. The hall seats 1200 people. There is a beautifully curved vaulted coffered ceiling lightly decorated in blue and gold. The Grand Hall is used for many masonic ceremonies including Grand Installations and is reputed to be the finest of its kind in Australia.

The floors are connected by a staircase consisting of varying coloured marble, white Carrara and black Buchan for the main stair with a green dado. A multi-coloured marble mosaic is a feature of the landing. The stair also features a wrought iron balustrade with polished timber handrail, and is top lit from above. The corridors have parquetry floors. The furniture throughout is silky oak, maple and cedar, all from Queensland, and particularly from Atherton.

The symmetrical facade and overscale columns give the building great presence as part of the streetscape in this portion of Ann Street.

== Heritage listing ==
Masonic Temple was listed on the Queensland Heritage Register on 21 October 1992 having satisfied the following criteria.

The place is important in demonstrating the evolution or pattern of Queensland's history.

The Masonic Temple was built as a monument to Freemasonry in Queensland and as a World War I memorial and is held in high esteem within the Masonic community.

The place demonstrates rare, uncommon or endangered aspects of Queensland's cultural heritage.

The Masonic Temple is an exceptional example of a Masonic Temple in Australia, it is the only dedicated Grand Hall in Australia which is capable of accommodating a Grand Installation.

The place is important in demonstrating the principal characteristics of a particular class of cultural places.

The Masonic Temple is a fine example of a Classical Revival building designed by LL Powell with particularly fine workmanship evident in its details and is significant for its substantial intactness both externally and internally.

The place is important because of its aesthetic significance.

The Masonic Temple is significant for its contribution to the streetscape of Ann Street brought to prominence by the scale of its facade with its giant order Corinthian columns and for the grandeur of its internal spaces especially the Grand Hall and the Court of Remembrance around its Memorial Urn.
