= Lange Powell =

Australian architect (1886 - 1938)

Langé Leopold Powell
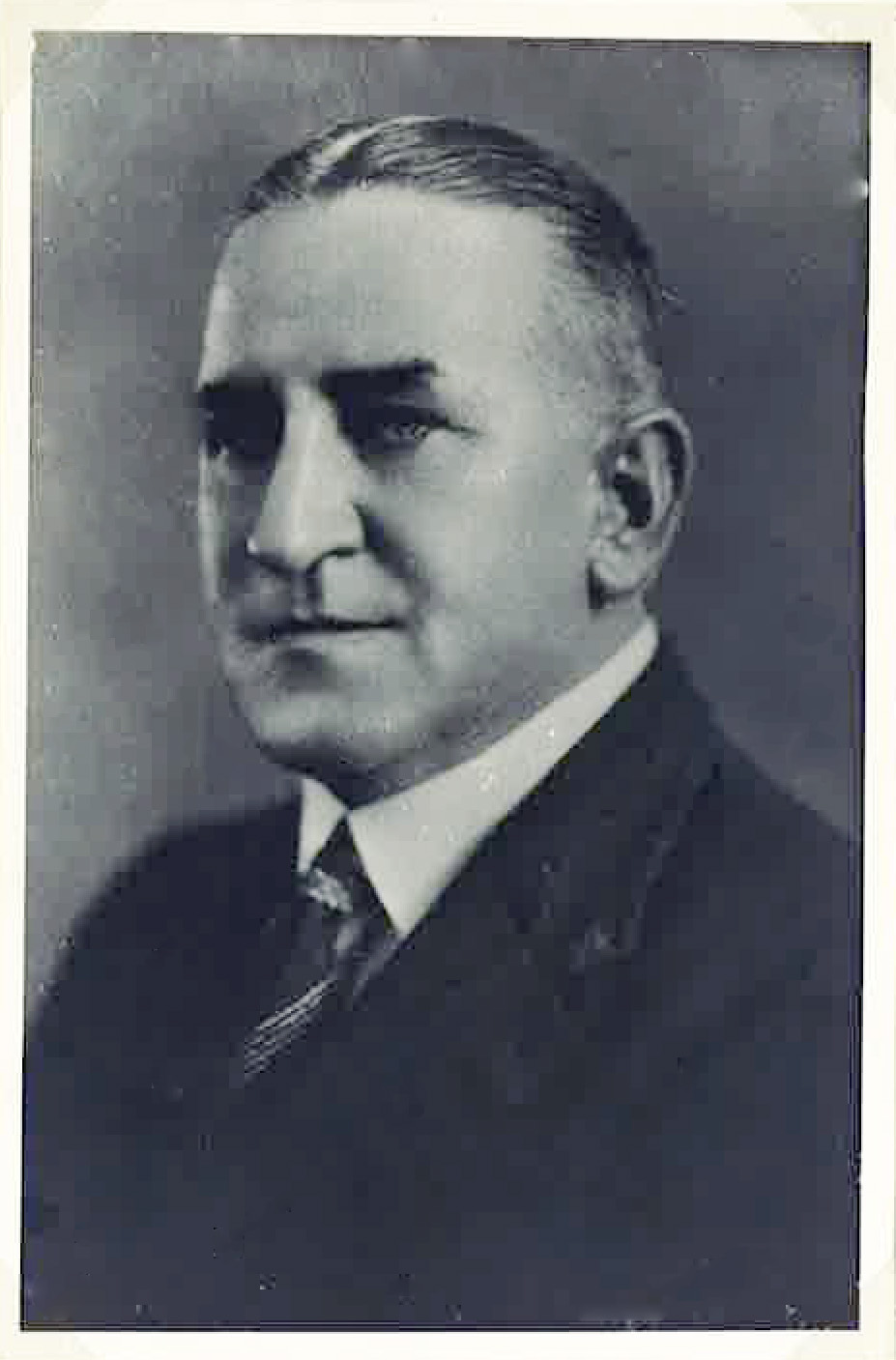
- Born: 2 July 1886; Rockhampton, Queensland, Australia
- Died: 29 October 1938 (aged 52); Brisbane, Queensland, Australia
- Occupation: Architect
- Parent(s): Mary Ellen née Zillman; William Powell
- Buildings: St Martins' Hospital; Masonic Temple, Brisbane; Perry House

Lange Leopold Powell (1886–1938) was a noted architect who designed many important buildings in Brisbane and the state of Queensland. He started practice in 1909; his major works included St Martin's War Memorial Hospital (opened 1922) and the Masonic Temple, Brisbane (1928)

Powell served as president of the Queensland Institute of Architects (1927–1931), as president of the Australian Institute of Architects (1928–1929), and as president of the Royal Australian Institute of Architects (1932–1933).

== Early years: 1886-1910 ==
=== Family life and education ===
Langé Leopold Powell was born in Rockhampton, Australia, on 2 July 1886 to the Methodist minister William Powell and his second wife, Mary Ellen née Zillman. He was the second of three children from William Powell’s second marriage and his seventh surviving child. Powell was named after Zillman’s grandparents, Clare Lange and Leopold Zillman, who in 1938 were among the first free settlers in the wider Brisbane district.

Powell’s family moved from Rockhampton to Brisbane in 1888, where he later was educated at Central Boys' School, Brisbane. During 1900 he was articled to G.H.M. Addison of the firm Addison & Corrie Architects, and during the next five years he would attend lectures at Brisbane Technical College. Shortly after he had finished his articles, he worked as a draughtsman for C.W. Chambers (1905–06) and briefly with the Public Works Department (1907).

=== Marriage and study in England ===
Throughout this time, Powell and Maude Moore of Murtoa, Victoria, began a relationship. During 1904, Moore temporarily moved to Brisbane for six months to live with her sister and her brother-in-law, who was a Methodist minister. The two met at a Methodist conference, which Powell’s father was organising that year. They became engaged in 1907, shortly before Powell left for England.

With the aid of Addison’s recommendation addressed to his good friend John Belcher, Powell began work for the well-established English firm Belcher & Co. He was very talented at pen and ink sketches and water-coloured renderings, and exhibited his work at the Royal Academy of Arts in London and the Louvre in Paris. In 1909, he became an architectural member of the Union des Beaux Arts et des Lettres of France. These works were later displayed at the Queensland Art Society on his return.

== Later years: 1910-1938 ==
=== Career and style ===
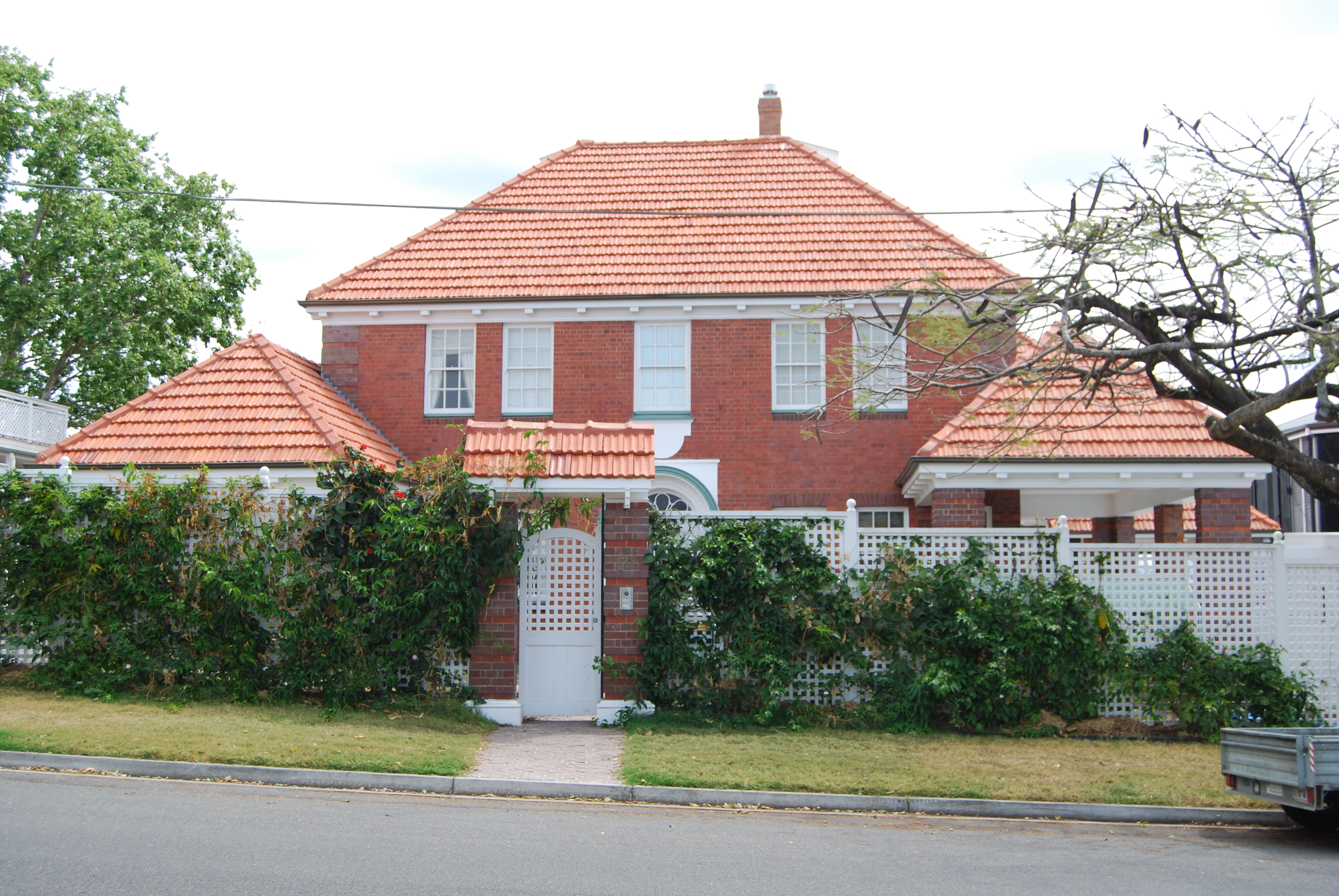
Powell's self-designed home in Hamilton, Brisbane.

Upon his return, Powell married Maude Moore in her hometown of Murtoa, Victoria. The couple only kept correspondence via letters during his three-year absence. Despite marrying in Victoria, the couple returned to live in Queensland where Powell began practicing with Claude Chambers, forming the firm Chambers and Powell in 1911. He was mostly responsible for designing and supervising as Chambers left for Sydney in 1915 to practice architecture. Powell eventually established his own practice in 1920 which also earned him the reputation as an accomplished designer. Powell’s career was arguably considered to be at its best between 1920 and 1930 as the majority of his works were designed between those times.

During the 1920s, there was a higher demand for architects and builders to collaborate with one another. Powell championed this idea, believing good supervision was required for the building to be true to plans. Builders that worked with Powell had high regard for him as he was easy to work with and would produce a certificate of payment in such short time.

Powell was known to have a forceful personality. He strove for a purity of style, and was rather outspoken in his criticism of other architects’ design as to whether it was true to classical or gothic style. Powell would never take other’s opinion into account if he felt that a thing was correct. He was known for not strictly following any particular "style", but instead he created his own hybrid of sorts, based on Renaissance detailing in a more simplified form. One common criticism Powell received was that he was not always faithful to architecture, and he had an intention to commercialise it. He also believed that women would make great architects, and between 1934 and 1935 Powell’s daughter (Joan Powell) worked for him and was under his apprenticeship.

Powell branded himself as “designer of public buildings” rather than as a domestic architect. He was the architect for Woolworths, Coles, the National Bank of Australasia, the Commercial Bank of Australia, the A.U.S.N Co., and was also the supervisor of any work for T. & G. Insurance.

He submitted drawings for three competitions and was successful twice. He was chosen to represent Queensland in a national competition to design a National Bank of Australasia in Brisbane. While Powell wasn't successful, the winning firm A. & K. Henderson appointed him as the construction supervisor. His winning designs for St. Martin’s Hospital (1920), and the Masonic Temple (1923) were a great success, with both considered among his best work.

=== St Martin’s Hospital ===
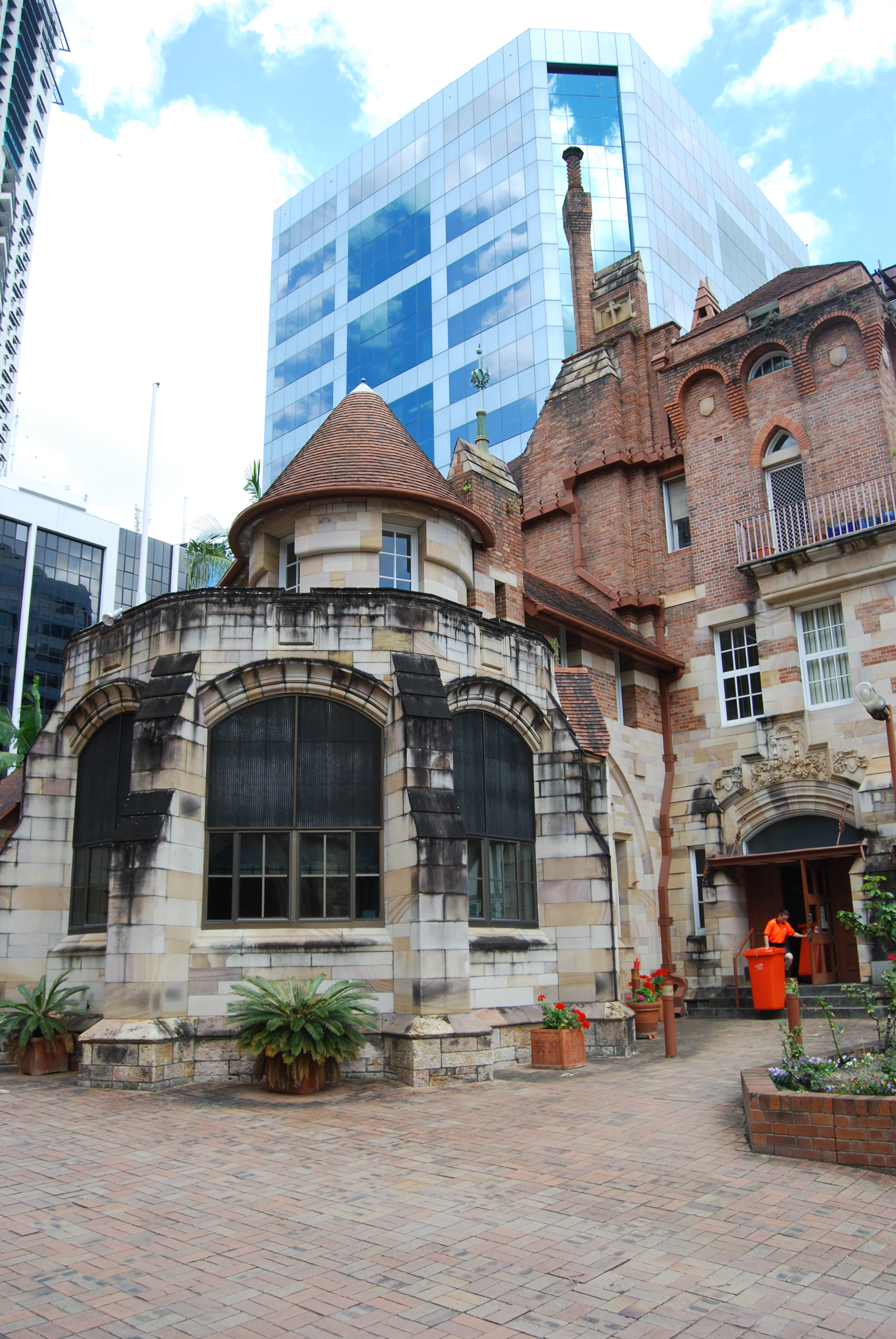
St Martin's Hospital in Ann Street, Brisbane

In 1920, Lange Powell won the competition for the St Martin's War Memorial Hospital. Powell was known to be skillful with pen, ink work and watercolour render, therefore he submitted a very beautiful perspective rendering of the hospital which was described by the Right Reverend St Clair Donaldson, Archbishop of Brisbane, as "a gem in architecture".

The proposed site was on Wickham Terrace where Anzac House now stands, but it was rejected because it was considered too far out of town. Powell designed it with a close; however it was proven to be irrelevant in some ways as it cuts off air ventilation to the patient’s room. The hospital is constructed using mainly bricks and stone on solid rock foundations. Thomas Keenan and Son were assigned as the contractors of the project.

The base consists of Brisbane tuff, the ground floor to first floor’s sill is made of sandstone and above this in brickwork with two stone string courses. The roof is high pitched and covered in shingle tiles and the windows are six paned pivot hung sashes. St. Martin’s consist of two storeys with the central portions in three.

It is evident that Powell was fond of ornamental rainwater heads. On the cathedral elevation there are two rainwater heads with arms extending five feet on either side, giving the appearance of a cross. The entrance is rather insignificant and opens into the vestibule which is paneled in dark oak timber. There are private rooms on the cathedral side and small wards on the other, which open onto a wide balcony. The nurses’ quarters are in a two-storey wing of Eton House, which is just adjacent to the hospital. A children’s wing was added in 1940 by John Darnell and the design is to blend with the main hospital.

Although it could be said St. Martin's is not the most practical design for a hospital, it was mentioned that Powell made the plan to suit the elevation. Despite this, it is undeniable that the building has a graceful charm and creates a feeling of tranquility in the person approaching it.

=== Masonic Temple ===
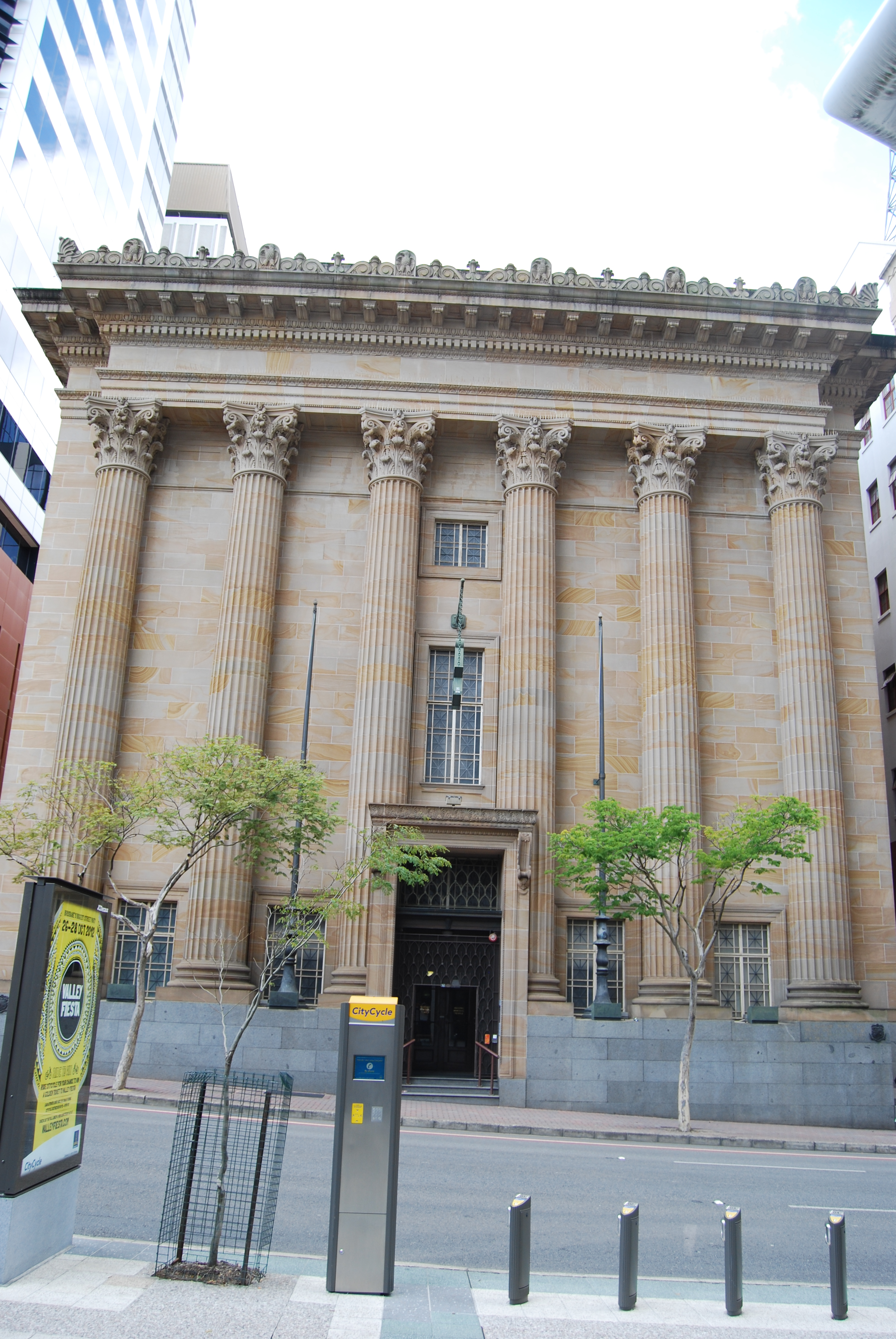
The Masonic Temple in Ann Street, Brisbane.

Lange Powell was one of the sixteen architects elected to submit designs for the proposed Masonic Temple in Brisbane and in 1924, the plans were analyzed and before December 1927 plans for the Temple had been prepared by the Grand Architect, Lange L. Powell. He was then a member of the firm Atkinson, Powell and Conrad.

Tenders were called on 12 March 1928 but the plans were drastically modified. The construction of the Masonic Temple commenced in May 1928. The total cost of the project summed up to £130,000 which included £7,000 for the land and £10,000 for furniture. Although the cost of the project was considered somewhat high, it was constructed to be able to take three more floors when this became necessary.

The six Corinthian columns are each five feet in diameter at the base. It is constructed of reinforced concrete, brick, stone and marble. The pipe organ was supplied by Messrs. B.B. Whitehouse and company. The furniture throughout is Silky Oak, maple and Cedar from Queensland. The entrance floor is in marble mosaic and this leads to a circular shrine surrounded by Doric columns and the floor pattern is star shaped with an urn of remembrance mounted on a black marble base in the centre of the floor. The offices, library and museum open off the circular vestibule. Two marble staircases lead to the upper floors. The handrail is timber supported on an attractive wrought iron balustrade and the corridors have parquetry floors. There are four lodge rooms on the first floor with corresponding supper rooms above.

The Grand Hall is on the third floor and is reputed to be the finest of its kind in Australia. The organ chamber claims twenty eight feet of this floor space and in front of it is a gallery seating twenty two choir members. The hall seats one thousand two hundred people. The walls have been rendered and given a sand float to give the appearance of sandstone. The interior wall decoration is simple, but there is a beautifully curved coffered ceiling lightly decorated in blue and gold.

Externally, the building is faced in sandstone and is classical in design. The base is in grey granite. The position of the entrance door is rather unfortunate as it cuts into the columns rather than coming between them.

== Architectural work ==
During his three-year study in England, Powell became an Associate of the Royal Institute of British Architects. On his return to Queensland, he took an immediate interest in the Queensland Institute of Architects and was selected as Honorary Secretary of the Institute for five years from 1910. He later became a councillor, Vice-President (1923–1927), and finally President (1927–1931). While Powell was President, the Architects’ Act of 1928 was passed which required aspiring architecture graduates to be registered before being able to practice. Powell did much of the preliminary work on the Bill and was substantially responsible for it becoming law.

Whilst each state had its own architectural institute, a unifying Federal Council was formed, hoping to allow further collaboration between states. Each state institute elected two members for the Federal Council of the Australian Institute of Architects and Powell was a representative for Queensland for many years. Powell worked hard during this time for the entrance examination level to study architecture be raised to Junior Standard. Powell was also president of the Federal Council for two years, from 1928 to 1929.

Powell also was integral in the formation of the Royal Australian Institute of Architects in 1930. With Sir Charles Rosenthal he drafted the initial constitution of the institute, and was the president for two years from 1932 to 1933. Whilst he was president Powell emphasised the importance of the institute, stating to members at a meeting, "I do particularly want to say that the expression of opinions I always welcomed, must always be welcomed, because it is only through going through these thorny paths that we get the ultimate end". Due to his efforts in the formation of the R.A.I.A, Powell was made a Fellow of the Royal Institute of British Architects.

== Metropolitan Water Supply & Sewerage Board v R. Jackson Limited ==
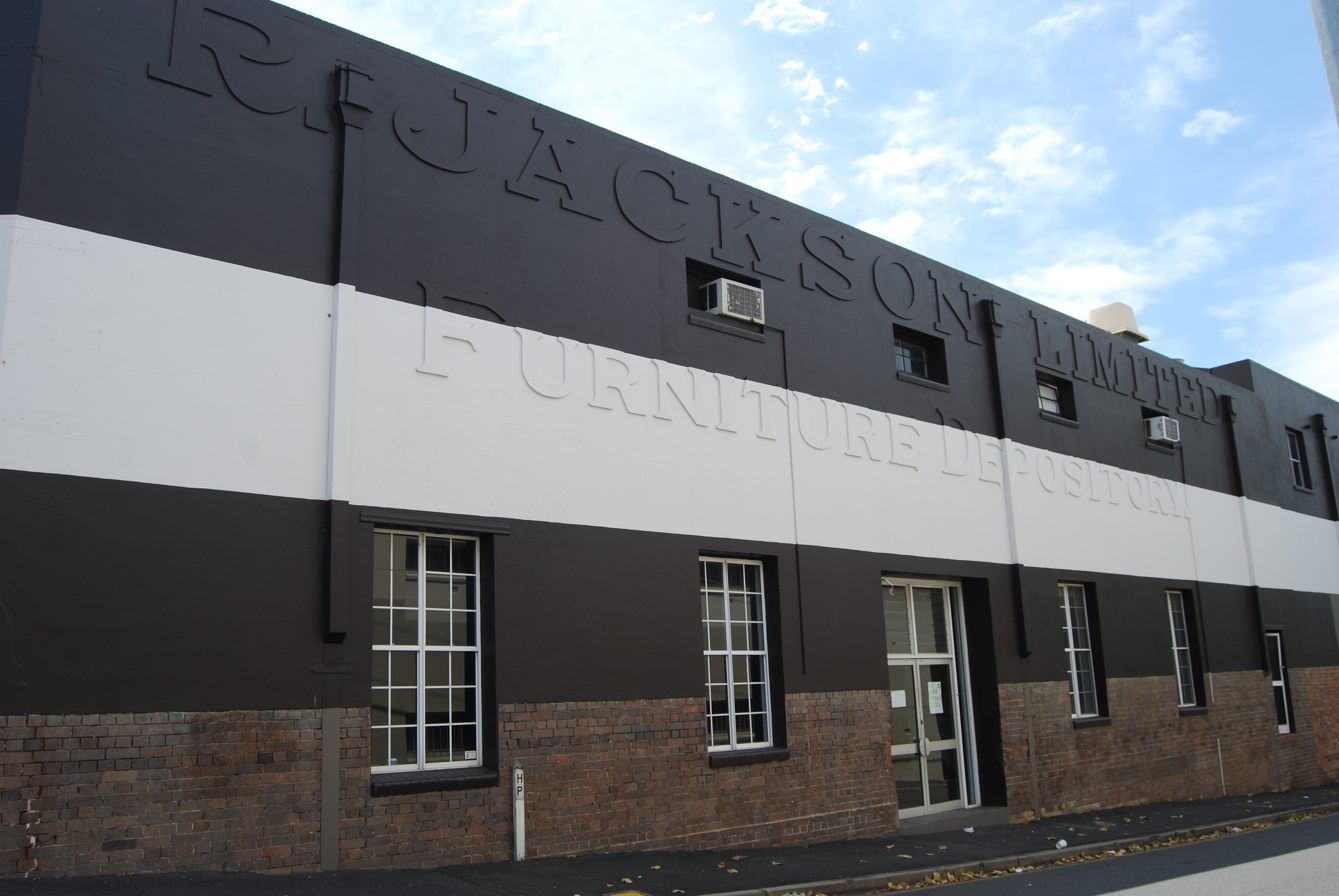
One of R. Jackson's warehouses designed by Powell.

During the early 1920s, the Metropolitan Water Supply and Sewerage board was implementing the Brisbane Sewerage Scheme, which included the maintenance and replacement of sewerage systems in Brisbane CBD. A trunk sewer was scheduled to be laid in Eagle Street, but during excavation several surrounding buildings, including Powell’s client R. Jackson’s warehouse, subsided and cracked. The property owners, claimed for compensation from the Sewerage board, and Powell was requested by Jackson to use his prior knowledge of the site and his extensive knowledge of building practices to act as their structural adviser. In 1924, Powell presented his case to the Supreme Court, prompting one judge to speak very highly of Powell's unbiased handling of the case. The following information is taken from Powell’s declaration during the Metropolitan Water Supply & Sewerage Board v R. Jackson Limited case, published in "The Queensland State Reports 1924, Decisions of the Supreme Court, Queensland".

The site Powell inspected was an irregular sized block constrained by the city’s grid system and the Brisbane River. The site contains several buildings: R. Jackson’s, the New Zealand Loan and Mercantile Agency Company's, the Australian Estates, the Brisbane Stock Exchange and the United Insurance buildings. The owners claimed that during the scheduled tunneling, excavation and blasting operations in Elizabeth, Eagle and Creek Streets and adjacent lanes, the Board’s negligence had damaged their buildings. These operations, Powell declared, had interfered with and weakened the foundations on which the buildings had been erected and had altered the level of support given by the subsoil. Consequently, this resulted in the further settling of buildings, and numerous cracks and breaks in the wall and structural elements.

Jackson and Powell also claimed that the damage would continue unless the Board paid to repair the buildings and prevent any further sinking. They also applied for compensation, claiming that both the land and buildings had greatly depreciated in value. The Board rebutted, stating that the owners knew the soil was insufficient for buildings of that size and that they had neglected to provide and construct adequate foundations. They also said the owners’ buildings were poorly constructed with inferior materials, and that the cracking of walls and structural elements was due to the lack of maintenance required.

Whilst the initial hearing at the Magistrates Court was in favour of the Metropolitan Water & Sewerage Board, Jackson appealed to the Supreme Court where Judge Lukin overturned the decision. Powell’s report in combination with independent expert analysis proved pivotal in the Supreme Court case, with Lukin stating ‘Mr. Powell has shown a considerable amount of ability, research and industry in supplying the Court with authorities in support of the opinions he has expressed." Compensation awarded for the New Zealand Loan was £600, for Jackson £250, and for the Australian Estates £160.

== Death and legacy ==
Towards the end of 1938, Powell fell ill with influenza which inevitably developed into pneumonia. He was taken to the hospital of his own design (St. Martin’s) where he died a few days later on 29 October 1938 at the age of 52.

The day after Powell’s death, The Courier Mail paid tribute to him by publishing an article about him. In the article, they mentioned how regretful they were to inform that Brisbane had lost one of its most prominent architects and popular citizens. The Courier Mail also paid tribute to his life and extensive career.

In 1940, Dr. Graham Brown, who was Powell’s greatest friend, donated the triptych for the Lady Chapel in St. John’s Cathedral, which Powell had been engaged in designing at the time of his death. The triptych was unveiled at the morning service by the then governor.

== Chronological list of work: 1910–1925 ==
=== Domestic work ===
1913

- Mrs S. Gibson, Old Sandgate Road, Clayfield

1914

- Mr Maddock Hughes, Marine Parade, Southport
- Mr A. S. Huybers, Corner New Sandgate Road & Adelaide Street, Clayfield
- Mr A. S. Huybers, New Sandgate Road, Clayfield

1915

- Mr. E. K. Brodrib, Gladstone Road, Dutton Park

1916

- Mr Matthew Laird, Southport
- Mr R. J. Archibald, Latrobe Terrace, Bardon (Remodelling)

1918

- Mr A. S. Huybers, Moreton Street, Newfarm
- Dr Wallis Hoare, Hanlon Terrace & Windmere Road, Hamilton
- Mrs Parker, NoLeod Street, Herston
- Miss Powell, Northgate

1919

- Mr R. J. Morris, Corner Windsor Road & Prospect Terrace, Red Hill
- Mr L. L. Powell, Windmere Road, Hamilton
- Dr C. R. Brown, Windmere Road, Hamilton (Alterations and Additions)

1920

- Mrs O. Sandel, Windmere Road, Hamilton
- Mr C. R. Christmas, Ascot
- Mr H. H. Henchman, Circe Street, Ascot (Alterations and Additions)

1921

- I.O.O.F. Orphanage, Manly (Alterations and Additions)
- Dr A. Crawford, Caboolture

1923

- Mr L. L. Powell, 50 Eldernell Avenue, Hamilton
- Mr W. Webb, Clayfield

1924

- Mr W. Fraser, New Farm

=== Commercial work ===
1910

- Perry House, Corner Albert & Elizabeth Streets, Brisbane

1913

- E.S. & A. Bank, Eagle Street, Brisbane
- Carlton Club Hotel, Queen Street, Brisbane (Alterations and Additions)

1915

- Parbury House, Eagle Street, Brisbane (Supervision)(Alterations and Additions)
- Exton & Co. Ltd., 333 Ann Street, Brisbane (Alterations and Additions)
- Preston House, Corner Queen Street and Eagle Lane, Brisbane
- Jenyns House, 327 George Street, Brisbane
- Robert Reid’s Building, Corner Edward & Charlotte Streets, Brisbane
- B. A. F. S. Dispensary, 331–333 George Street, Brisbane
- Hide & Skin Store, J. W. H. Turner & Co., Corner Longland & Master Streets, Bulimba

1918

- B. A. F. S. Dispensary, 146 Wickham Street, Valley (Alterations and Additions)

1919

- Exton House, 337 Queen Street, Brisbane
- Thomas Brown, Corner Eagle & Queen Streets, Brisbane (Alterations and Additions)
- Inglis Limited, Corner Boundary & Adelaide Streets, Brisbane
- Commercial Bank of Australia, Southport

1920

- N. B. A. in Thomas Brown, Corner Eagle & Queen Streets, Brisbane
- National Bank of Australia, Mareeba
- Ward Motors, Mackay (Alterations and Additions)
- Ruston & Hornsby Warehouse, 472 Ann Street, Brisbane
- R. Jackson, Corner Brunswick & Water Streets, Valley
- Bonney & Clarke, Corner Elizabeth & George Streets, Brisbane

1921

- National Bank of Australasia, Home Hill
- National Bank of Australasia, Atherton
- Rickleman’s Building, Victoria Street, Mackay

1922

- Queensland Pastoral Supplies, Bowen Street, Brisbane (Alterations and Additions)
- Commercial Bank of Australia, Cairns
- William Brooks, Wickham Street, Valley
- Perry House, Corner Albert and Elizabeth Streets, Brisbane (New Floor)

1923

- R. Jackson, Corner Water and Brunswick Streets, Valley
- National Bank of Australasia, Innisfail
- Empire Chambers, Corner Queen & Wharf Streets, Brisbane (Four Floors)
- Professional Chambers, Wickham Terrace, Brisbane

1924

- R. Jackson Warehouse, Corner Ann & Wandoo Streets, Valley
- Griffith House, Queen Street, Brisbane
- Ballow Chambers, Wickham Terrace, Brisbane
- Penfold’s Building, Ann Street, Brisbane
- National Bank of Australasia, Bundaberg
- National Bank of Australasia, Gipps Street, Fortitude Valley
- Commercial Bank of Australia, Murwillumbah
- Commercial Bank of Australia, Townsville
- Commercial Bank of Australia, Nambour
- L. Uhl & Son, Petrie Bight, Brisbane (Alterations and Additions)
- Roma Street Investments, Roma Street, Brisbane (Alterations and Additions)

1925

- Nestles Building, Ann Street, Brisbane
- Warehouse for Mrs Alice Wilson, Charlotte Street, Brisbane
- New Tattersalls Hotel, Blackall
- National Bank of Australasia, Home Hill
- National Bank of Australasia, Cairns
- National Bank of Australasia, Stanthorpe
- Commercial Bank of Australia, Ipswich
- Austral Motors Building, 95 Boundary Street, Valley

=== Ecclesiastical work ===
1919

- Methodist Church, Kennedy Terrace, Bardon

1920

- St. Luke’s Church of England, Rosewood

1921

- St. Paul’s Church of England, Winton

1923

- Holy Trinity Church Complex, 39 Gordon Street, Mackay (Thought to be completed by Powell)

1924

- Methodist Church, Vulture Street, West End (Alterations and Additions)
- Cathedral Wall, Adelaide Street, Brisbane

=== Schools and hospitals ===
1919

- Somerville House, ‘Cumbooqueapa’, 253 Vulture Street, South Brisbane (Classroom Block)

1921

- St. Martin’s War Hospital, 373 Ann Street, Brisbane
