= St Martin's House =

Heritage-listed building in Brisbane, Queensland

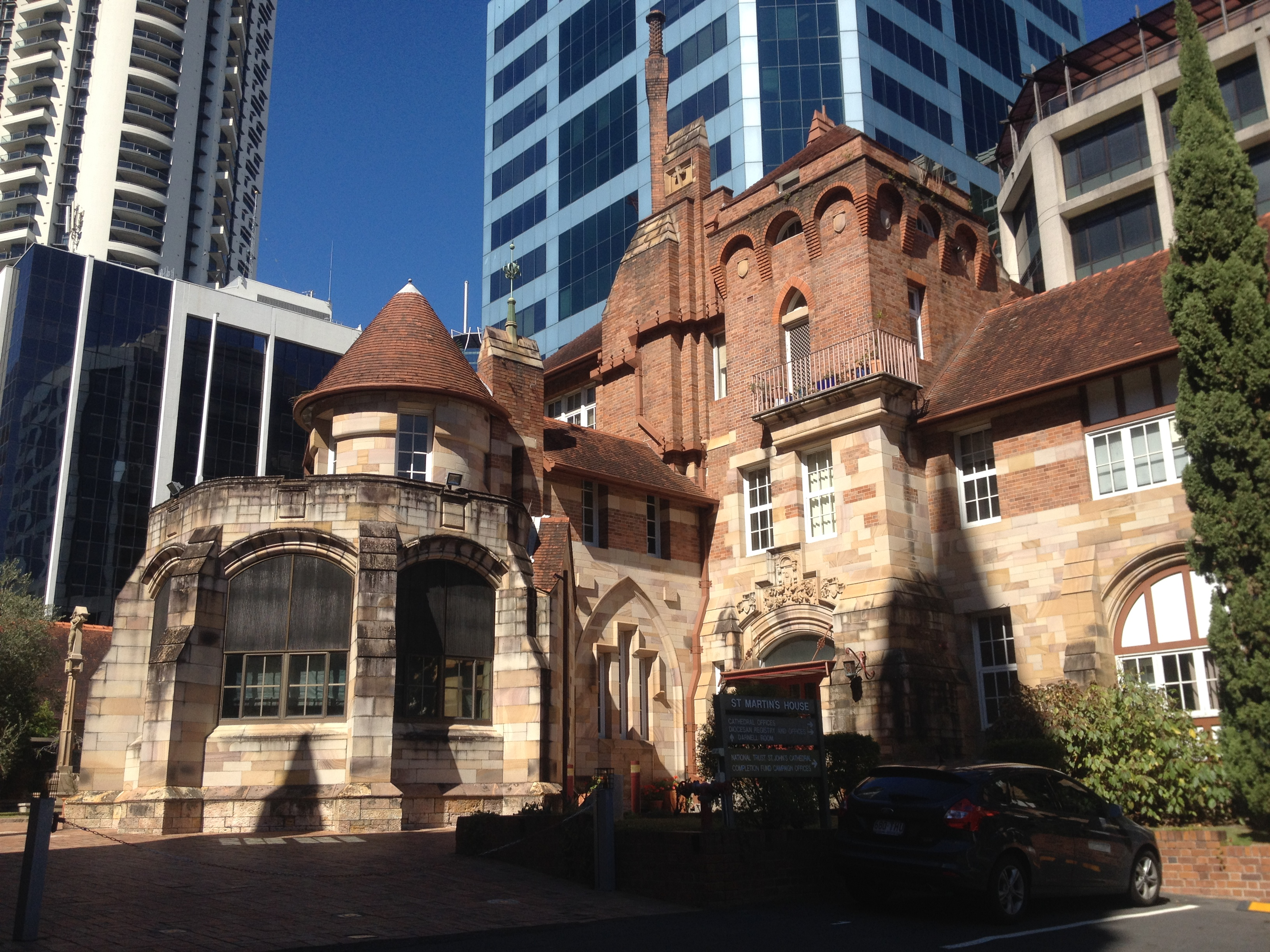
- St Martin's House, 2014

- Location within Queensland
- 27.4642°S 153.0297°E
- Location: 373 Ann Street, Brisbane City, City of Brisbane, Queensland, Australia

History
- Design period: 1919–1930s (interwar period)
- Built: c. 1922

Site notes
- Architect: Lange Leopold Powell
- Architectural style: Arts & Crafts

Queensland Heritage Register
- Official name: St Martin's House, St Martin's Hospital
- Type: state heritage (built)
- Designated: 21 October 1992
- Reference no.: 600075
- Significant period: c. 1922 (fabric); 1920s–1970s (historical)
- Significant components: theatre – operating, other – health/care services: component
- Builders: Thomas Keenan

St Martin's House is a heritage-listed former private hospital and now administration building within the grounds of St John's Cathedral at 373 Ann Street, Brisbane City, City of Brisbane, Queensland, Australia. It was designed by Lange Leopold Powell and built c. 1922 by Thomas Keenan. It is also known as St Martin's Hospital. It was added to the Queensland Heritage Register on 21 October 1992.

== History ==
St Martin's House was built as a hospital by the Anglican Church as a memorial to those who had fought in World War I. The name St Martin's Hospital was chosen as the Armistice of World War I (11 November 1918) had been signed on St Martin's day.

In 1920, architect Lange Powell won the competition for the St Martin's War Memorial Hospital. Powell was known to be skillful with pen, ink work and watercolour render, therefore he submitted a perspective rendering of the hospital which was described by the Most Reverend St Clair Donaldson, Archbishop of Brisbane, as "a gem in architecture". It was an accomplished design by an eminent local architect with an eclectic repertoire.

The proposed site was on Wickham Terrace where Anzac House now stands, but it was rejected because it was considered too far out of town. The hospital is constructed using mainly bricks and stone on solid rock foundations. Thomas Keenan and Son were assigned as the contractors of the project.

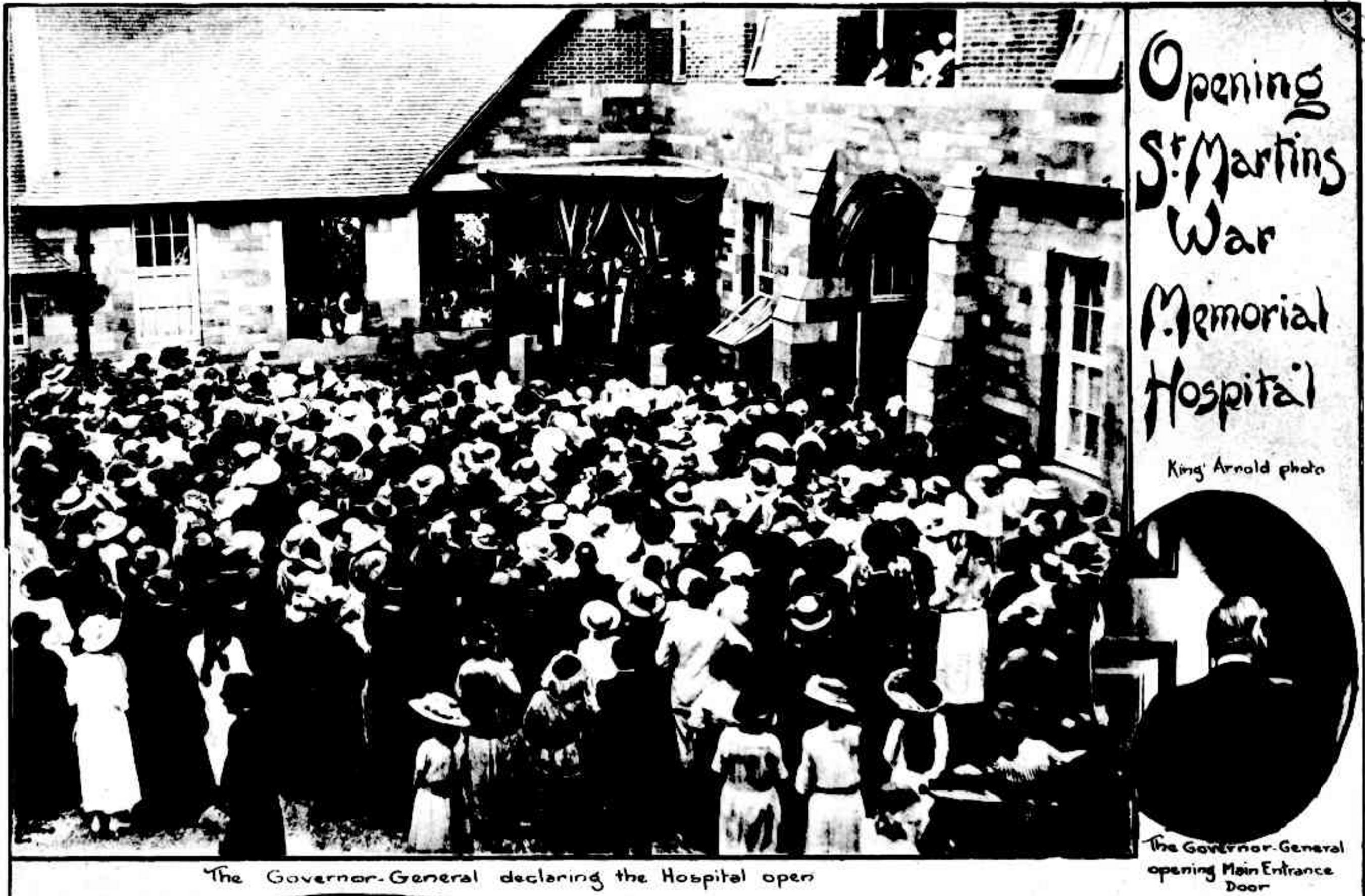
Opening of St Martin's War Memorial Hospital, 1922

St Martin's Hospital was built by local contractor Thomas Keenan & Son for approximately £46,000 ($92,000). The hospital was officially opened On 28 November 1922 and dedicated by the then Governor-General of Australia, Lord Forster.

The hospital was run by the Sisters of the Sacred Advent to care for the sick, and contained seven main wards, single rooms and two operating theatres. The main kitchen was built on the top floor, while smaller kitchens were installed on each floor for food distribution. Powell designed it with a close; however it was proven to be irrelevant in some ways as it cuts off air ventilation to the patient's room.

A children's wing was added in 1940. In 1945 a statue of St Martin, designed by William Bustard and crafted by Jack Muller was set in the Ann Street wall of the hospital.

In June 1971 the hospital was closed, and the patients moved to a new hospital at Zillmere. During the 1970s, plans to demolish the building were thwarted by a public campaign led by the Save St. Martin's Committee.

Recently the building was renovated, and in November 1990 St Martin's House was opened as the administrative headquarters for the Anglican Diocese. The top floor was converted to living quarters for the Precentor.

== Description ==
St Martin's House is built on stone foundations with external walls of brick with sandstone facings, and is roofed with terracotta shingle tiles. The building is organised in plan so as to create a series of protected courtyards around the south transept of St John's Cathedral. This maintains the continuity of the system of closed spaces that surround the cathedral on three sides. The base consists of Brisbane tuff, the ground floor to first floor's sill is made of sandstone and above this in brickwork with two stone string courses. The roof is high pitched and the windows are six paned pivot hung sash windows.

The massing of the building is centred on the service tower which has radiating wings. The tower has three levels and a basement while the remainder of the building is two storeyed. The facade oriented towards the cathedral is the most ornate, with a conical roof over the operating theatre, but that towards the south west with its cloister is also an important part of the building. Openings are a combination of square headed and semi-circular, segmented, and Gothic arches.

It is evident that Powell was fond of ornamental rainwater heads. On the cathedral elevation there are two rainwater heads with arms extending five feet on either side, giving the appearance of a cross. The entrance is rather insignificant and opens into the vestibule which is paneled in dark oak timber. There are private rooms on the cathedral side and small wards on the other, which open onto a wide balcony. The nurses’ quarters are in a two-storey wing of Eton House, which is just adjacent to the hospital. A children's wing was added in 1940 by John Darnell and the design is to blend with the main hospital. Although St Martin's is arguably not the most practical design for a hospital, it was mentioned that Powell made the plan to suit the elevation.

The exterior is enhanced by the quality of the detailing including: the corbelled brickwork, cruciform rain-water spouts, and the statue of St Martin of Tours in a niche in the western gable.

Arts and Crafts elements are clearly evident, and visually there are many similarities with the house most identified with that movement in the United Kingdom, the Red House by Philip Webb. Gothic elements are also present and St Martin's complements the other buildings which form the cathedral group.

Internally almost all the evidence of the building's use as a hospital has been lost in its change to office and residential use. Although the joinery has been retained, the northern wards and central corridor have been combined into one large office area and suspended ceilings installed. The original top floor kitchen has been converted into living quarters. The southern verandah is enclosed, and a fire stair has been constructed behind the facade facing Ann Street.

== Heritage listing ==
St Martin's House was listed on the Queensland Heritage Register on 21 October 1992 having satisfied the following criteria.

The place is important in demonstrating the evolution or pattern of Queensland's history.

St Martin's House is significant as a memorial to World War I servicemen and women. The building also survives as evidence of the nursing activities of the Sisters of the Sacred Advent.

The place is important in demonstrating the principal characteristics of a particular class of cultural places.

St Martin's House is significant as a highly accomplished building displaying characteristic Arts and Crafts massing, fine detail and workmanship, and a range of major materials. The building forms an integral part of a group of ecclesiastical buildings and spaces.

The place is important because of its aesthetic significance.

St Martin's House is significant as a highly accomplished building displaying characteristic Arts and Crafts massing, fine detail and workmanship, and a range of major materials. The building forms an integral part of a group of ecclesiastical buildings and spaces.

The place has a special association with the life or work of a particular person, group or organisation of importance in Queensland's history.

St Martin's House is significant as a fine example of the work of eminent architect Lange Powell, and a major work of Thomas Keenan, builder.
