= Wittey =

Wittey is a surname. Notable people with the surname include:

- David Wittey (born 1966), Australian rules footballer
- Neville Wittey (born 1957), Australian sailor

== See also ==
- Whitty
- Withey
- Witty (disambiguation)
