= Whitty =

Whitty is a surname. Notable people with the name include:

- Alice Whitty (1934–2017), Canadian high jumper
- Allen Whitty (1867–1949), English sport shooter
- Bill Whitty (1886–1974), Australian Test cricketer
- Chris Whitty (born 1966), British physician and epidemiologist
- Dennis Whitty (1941–1963), English convicted murderer
- Edward Michael Whitty (1827–1860), English journalist
- Ernest Whitty (1907–1985), English footballer
- Frank Whitty (1905–2001), Australian rules footballer
- Geoff Whitty (1946–2018), British professor at the University of Newcastle, Australia
- George Whitty American musician, composer, producer, and engineer
- Jeff Whitty (born 1971), American playwright
- Jim Whitty (1931–2015), American politician from Oregon
- Joseph Whitty (1904-1923), Irish Republican, died on hunger strike
- Larry Whitty, Baron Whitty (born 1943), British Labour Party politician
- Lucinda Whitty (born 1989), Australian sailor
- May Whitty (1865–1948), English stage and film actress
- Michael James Whitty (1795–1873), English newspaper editor and proprietor
- Patrick Whitty (1894–1967), Irish nationalist politician and MP in the House of Commons of the United Kingdom
- Paul Whitty (born 1970) British composer
- Robert Whitty (1817–1895), Irish Jesuit priest
- Rose Whitty (1831–1911), Irish Religious Sister and foundress of convents
- Sophia St John Whitty (1877–1924), Irish woodcarver, teacher, and cooperativist
- Stan Whitty, English rugby league footballer
- Thomas Whitty (1713–1792), English carpet manufacturer
- Mother Vincent Whitty (1819–1892), Irish Religious Sister known for her work in the Australian state of Queensland

== See also ==
- Witty (disambiguation)
  - Witty (surname)
