= Paul Baratte =

French engineer and inspector general of bridges and roads

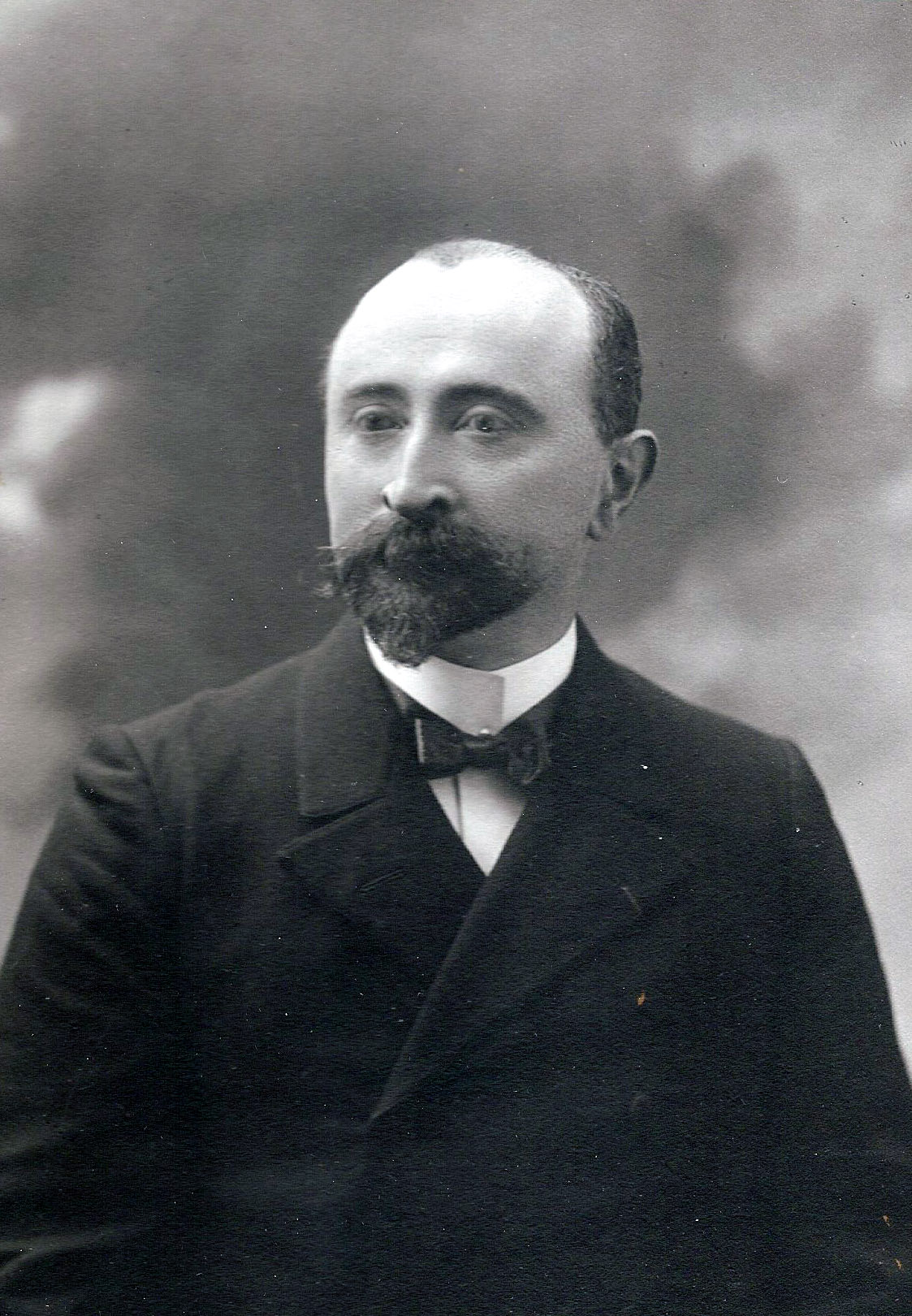
- Born: Paul Étienne Augustin François Baratte; December 20, 1860; Villing, Moselle, France
- Died: December 3, 1928 (aged 67); Troyes, France
- Occupation: Engineer

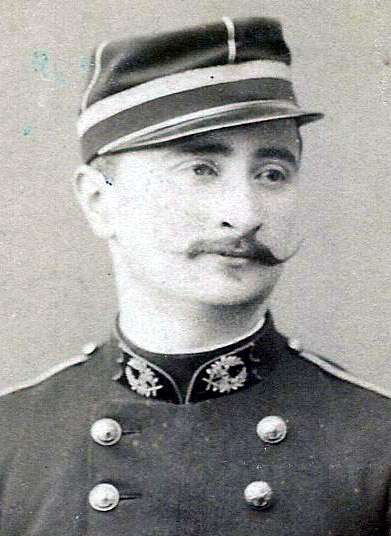
Paul Baratte

Paul Baratte ( December 20, 1860, Villing – December 3, 1928, Troyes) was a French engineer and inspector general of bridges and roads. He led the water and sanitation department of the City of Paris in the mid-1920s.

== Biography ==
=== Family and childhood ===
Paul Étienne Augustin François Baratte was the son of Augustin Baratte (1818–1871), a customs captain, and Marie François (1820–1897).

He was born in 1860 in Villing (Moselle), a customs post on the German border, and spent his early years there.

Starting in 1863, his family moved to Longwy, where his father was assigned. After his father's death in 1871 at the siege of Longwy during the Franco-Prussian War, he moved to Nancy.

=== Education ===
As a student at the National Lycée of Nancy (later renamed Henri-Poincaré), he obtained bachelor's degrees in literature and sciences. He entered the École polytechnique in 1880 and graduated in 1882. He furthered his education at the École des Ponts et Chaussées from 1882 to 1885, where he became an engineer of bridges and roads.

=== Career in the civil service ===
Paul Baratte began his career in Troyes from 1885 to 1894, where he met his wife. He was then assigned to Sedan from 1894 to 1897, where his eldest daughter was born.

In 1897, he joined the Paris Municipal Works Department, a position he held for nearly thirty years until his retirement.

He was in charge of two sections of the public road service and worked on significant projects related to the Loing and Lunain rivers under the supervision of Georges Bechmann.

Promoted to Chief Engineer in 1907, he served as the deputy head of the technical service for water and sanitation in Paris from 1905 to 1924. Appointed Inspector General by a decree on October 12, 1920, he directed the water and sanitation service of the City of Paris from 1924 to 1926. He worked on projects related to the water supply to Paris from the Loire valleys. He retired on October 1, 1926, after 44 years of civil service and 2 years of military service.

=== Death ===
He died on December 3, 1928, in Troyes (Aube). He was buried in the family chapel in the Villette Cemetery (Meurthe-et-Moselle).

== Personal life ==
Paul Baratte married Madeleine Tenting (1873–1952) on November 11, 1895, in Laignes (Côte d'Or).

The couple had three children:

- Françoise Baratte (1896–1954) who married Dupuis.
- Jacques Baratte (1898–1989), an industrialist, officer, and resistance member.
- Yvonne Baratte (1910–1945), a painter and engraver, and a member of the resistance.

== Military, scientific, and cultural activities ==
Paul Baratte served as an officer in the reserve and territorial units of the engineering corps from 1882 (as a sub-lieutenant) to 1905 (as a captain).

He was a corresponding member of the Academic Society of Agriculture, Sciences, Arts, and Literature of the Aube department, elected in 1895.

He was a founding member, vice-president, and later president of the General Association of Hygienists and Municipal Technicians in 1928.

== Distinctions ==
- Officer of the Legion of Honor (appointed on October 30, 1920, with the decoration presented on December 15, 1920, in Paris by Émile Baratte, a medical inspector in the reserve), and Knight since July 9, 1902.
- Communal Medal of Honor (Silver) of Paris on July 9, 1925.
- Order of Ouissam Alaouite (Morocco) on March 14, 1927.
- Medal of Public Health on July 9, 1925.
