= Siege of Rocroi =

1871 battle of the Franco-Prussian war

- Part of Franco-Prussian War
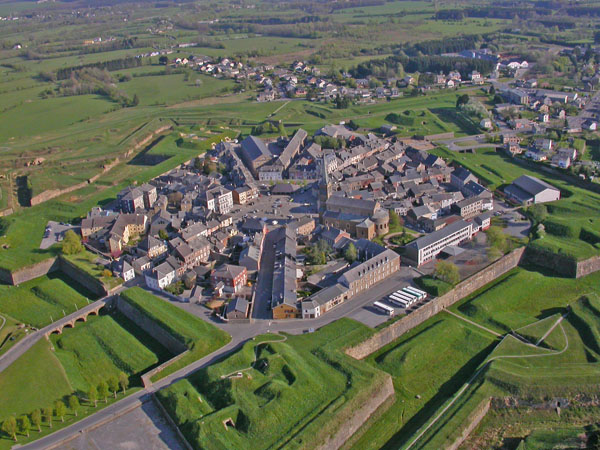
- Rocroi seen from the air
Date	4–6 January 1871
Location	Rocroi, Ardennes, France
Result	German Victory

Belligerents
French Republic	North German Confederation: Prussia

Commanders and leaders
Unknown	Wilhelm von Woyna; Schuler von Senden

Units involved
Garde Mobile	14th Division

Strength
150–160 soldiers and 120 artillery soldiers and engineers	5 infantry battalions, 2 hussar divisions, 6 field guns and 1 company of engineers

Casualties and losses
8 officers and 300 soldiers were captured 1 flag frame, many weapons, food and ammunition, along with 72 heavy artillery were captured	Unknown

The siege of Rocroi was a battle of the Franco-Prussian War, it took place between 4 and 6 January 1871 at Rocroi which was a bastion of France located to the west of Sedan. After an artillery fire by the Prussian army, the officer commanding the French troops at Rocroi was forced to surrender the Division Militia under General Schuler and Sendan and Wilhelm von Woyna. With the success of the Siege of Rocroi, the military spectrum was obtained on their hands were hundreds of prisoners (of which there are several officers) along with many stocks, costumes and contemporary heavyweight artillery of the French. During this siege, the town of Rocroi was heavily destroyed. The fall of Rocroi marked one of the German army's consecutive victories in the war.

The small fortress of Rocroi, located on the French-Belgian border, is located on a hilly plateau in the Ardennes forest, the Mézières to the northwest, and was captured by the Prussian army in 1815 during the Napoleonic Wars. After the Prussians, under the command of Major General Wilhelm von Woyna captured Mézières on 2 January 1871, the 14th Division of the spectrum has been resting for a few days to arrange for their next military campaign. To save time and materials on fortress blockades like earlier sieges of the war, the Germans decided to capture Rocroi with a sudden attack. And, on 4 January, in an attempt to capture Rocroi, the German infantry and cavalry forces of General Von Senden's division, along with field batteries, marched out. They approached the fortress later that day, and the twilight sky on 5 January prevented the French in the fortress from conducting any reconnaissance forces. They were completely surprised by the enemy's presence which was a testament to the skill of the Prussians in carrying out the campaign. With careful preparation, the Prussians were able to encircle Rocroi, but when the Germans suggested the surrender of the commanding officer of the French garrison, the fog in the morning obscured the German armies to the east of Rocroi. The French commanding officer refused to surrender, and the German army launched artillery fire on Rocroi. Faced with this situation, many soldiers of the French Garde Mobile had to flee, and a fire broke out in the town. The fierce resistance of the French artillery failed, and the German bombardment gave them a decisive victory. In the evening, a German officer was ordered to call on the French to surrender and the officer noticed the turmoil of the French garrison and the townspeople in Rocroi.

The commanding officer of the French army garrison had urged the German army should enter Rocroi which was the only fort was occupied by German forces that wasn't raided during the war. With the French surrender, the Germans pulled into the town and ceased fire. Almost half of the French artillery at Rocroi fled, the rest were sent back to Germany.
