= Siege of Longwy (1871) =

- Part of Franco-Prussian War
Date	16 – 25 January 1871
Location	Longwy, Meurthe-et-Moselle, France
Result	German Victory.

Belligerents
French Republic	North German Confederation: Prussia German Empire

Commanders and leaders
Colonel Massaroly	Georg von Kameke; Colonel Von Cosel

Casualties and losses
Nearly 4,000 people were captured, 200 artillery pieces and a number of military reserves were seized	9 people killed and 20 injured

The siege of Longwy was a military conflict during the Franco-Prussian War, which took place from 16 to 25 January 1871, in the Longwy which was near the border of Belgium and Luxembourg. (Under a Personal Union with the Netherlands) After the artillery fire from the Prussian army, the siege ended with the defenders of Longwy under the command of Colonel Massaroly surrendering to Prussia under the command of Colonel Von Cosel. With this victory, the Prussian army captured many prisoners and cannons (many of which were damaged) of the enemy. This was one of the consecutive victories of the German army in a short period of time during the war. The town of Longwy was badly damaged during the siege.

== The Battle ==
During the Sieges of Montmédy and Mézières, Prussian soldiers were dispatched to observe the detachment in Longwy, and sometimes carry out a campaign against the franc-tireur's of France. Communication between the franc-tireur soldiers and French troops stationed in Longwy led to the officer commanding the fort to know the movements of the enemy. Faced with this situation, he sent two battalions to hold back the Prussian detachments at Tellancourt and Frenois la Montague. Although the Prussians were raided and the French took a number of prisoners, the French were defeated overnight on 26 and 27 December 1870. Initially, the German army formed a siege detachment of Longwy consisting of infantry and cavalry of the Landwehr militia led by Major Count Von Schmettau, but later, the armies were in charge of the siege. Longwy arrived. From the end of November, the Prussian army under the command of Colonel Von Cosel blockaded Longwy, and Georg von Kameke assumed command of the 14th Infantry Division. In the Prussian siege corps, Major Wolf was the commander of the artillery force, and Colonel Schott was entrusted with the management of construction works for the Prussian siege. Between 16 and 19 January 1871, to keep the French garrison unaware of the German preparations for the attack, and even to keep the French from grasping the construction of Building German batteries, the German field batteries took positions supported by the area opposite the fort, and opened fire on Longwy. This first artillery attack caused panic among the townspeople, and the French garrison took up arms until they were exhausted. And, on 19 January, the Germans launched their artillery bombardment.

After strengthening the defense, the French in the fortress launched a counterattack. Thanks to its high terrain and fortified stone fortifications, Longwy stood up to German bombardment. On 22 January, however, the French were unable to prevent the Germans from building their own horizontal trenches, and on that day the Prussian Artillery reaped the rewards. The artillery battle between the two factions continued for several days. In the last days, the German shelling became fierce, pushing the French into chaos. Finally, on 24 January, when the Germans were preparing for the widening of the horizontal trench of their own, the French requested a ceasefire to negotiate their surrender. On the morning of 25 January the French army at Longwy formally surrendered. During this period, the French army was defeated everywhere, and 3 days after the fall of Longwy, the French capital Paris also fell into a similar situation.

== Bibliography ==
- Monday, November 7, 1870
- Longwy - Encyclopedia Britannica, 2008.
