= Siege of Montmédy =

Military event

- Part of Franco-Prussian War
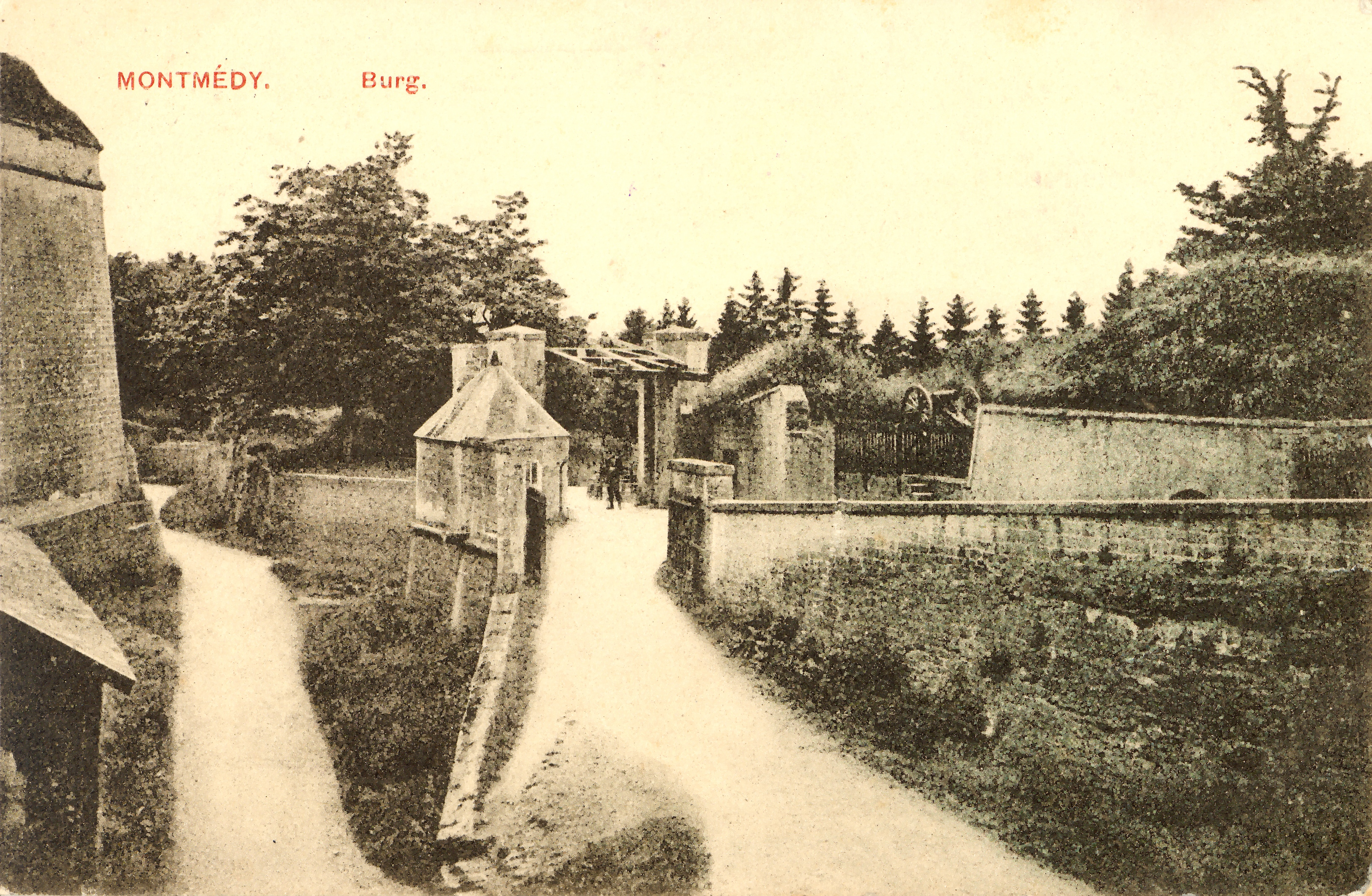
- The citadel of Montmédy
Date	November 15 — December 14, 1870
Location	Montmédy, Meuse, France (Note: Israel Smith Clare, Illustrated universal history: being a clear and concise history of all nations, from the earliest ages down to modern times, including the most recent important events in all parts of the world. A full history of the United States. A table of the great events of the world's history, in chronological order. A table of the kings and rulers of the world, with the dates in which they reigned. And a pronouncing dictionary of historical proper names, Page 409) 49°31′13″N 05°22′0.12″E
Result	German victory

Belligerents
French Republic	North German Confederation: Prussia; Saxony

Commanders and leaders
Genie Tessier; General Reboul	Georg von Kameke; Kraft zu Hohenlohe-Ingelfingen

Units involved
Unknown	Division Infantry No. 14

Strength
More than 3,000 troops, 65 cannons	Unknown

Casualties and losses
30 – 40 killed, 50–60 wounded, 3,000 captured, 65 artillery, many gun stores, Prussian prisoners (including 24 officers and 237 soldiers) were freed	Unknown killed, 12 injured

The siege of Montmédy was a battle of the Franco-Prussian War at the small commune of Montmédy, in the Meuse, it was besieged by the army of the German coalition. Defended by the 57th Line Infantry Regiment, the Garde Mobile and elements of other units, it surrendered on December 14, 1870.

== Background ==
In 1870, Montmédy was a small town of 3,000 inhabitants. The upper town, that is to say, the fortress proper, formed a triangular platform surrounded by bastions 70 m (230 ft) above the level of the Chiers, a tributary of the Meuse, or 104 m (341 ft) above sea level. The Chiers constitutes a loop that constitutes the first protection of the place. The lower town is surrounded by a rubble wall of low defensive value 2, crenellated, and 6 m 3 high, while the upper town dominates the outskirts with rock or masonry slopes 20 to 25 m 4 high. A postern barred by gates, with firing positions, connects the lower town to the fortress. Exterior structures cover the Tivoli pass and Montmédy station. The fortifications, built by the Spaniards and reworked by Vauban, are of poor layout and offer little protection against artillery. The square lacks bomb-proof shelters, stores and well-protected firing positions. A circle of heights surrounds Montmédy at a distance of 2.5 to 4 km (1.6 to 2.5 mi) from the ramparts, which exposes it to enemy artillery fire.

Located 6 km (3.7 mi) from the Belgian border, Montmédy is part of a set of small fortresses between the Meuse and the Moselle. However, it was too small to house any large forces. It was nevertheless used to block communications between the Ardennes railway and the imperial road. The railway line, to the east of the station, crosses a 900 m-long (3,000 ft) tunnel known as the "Tivoli pass".

== Start of hostilities ==
Beginning of hostilities

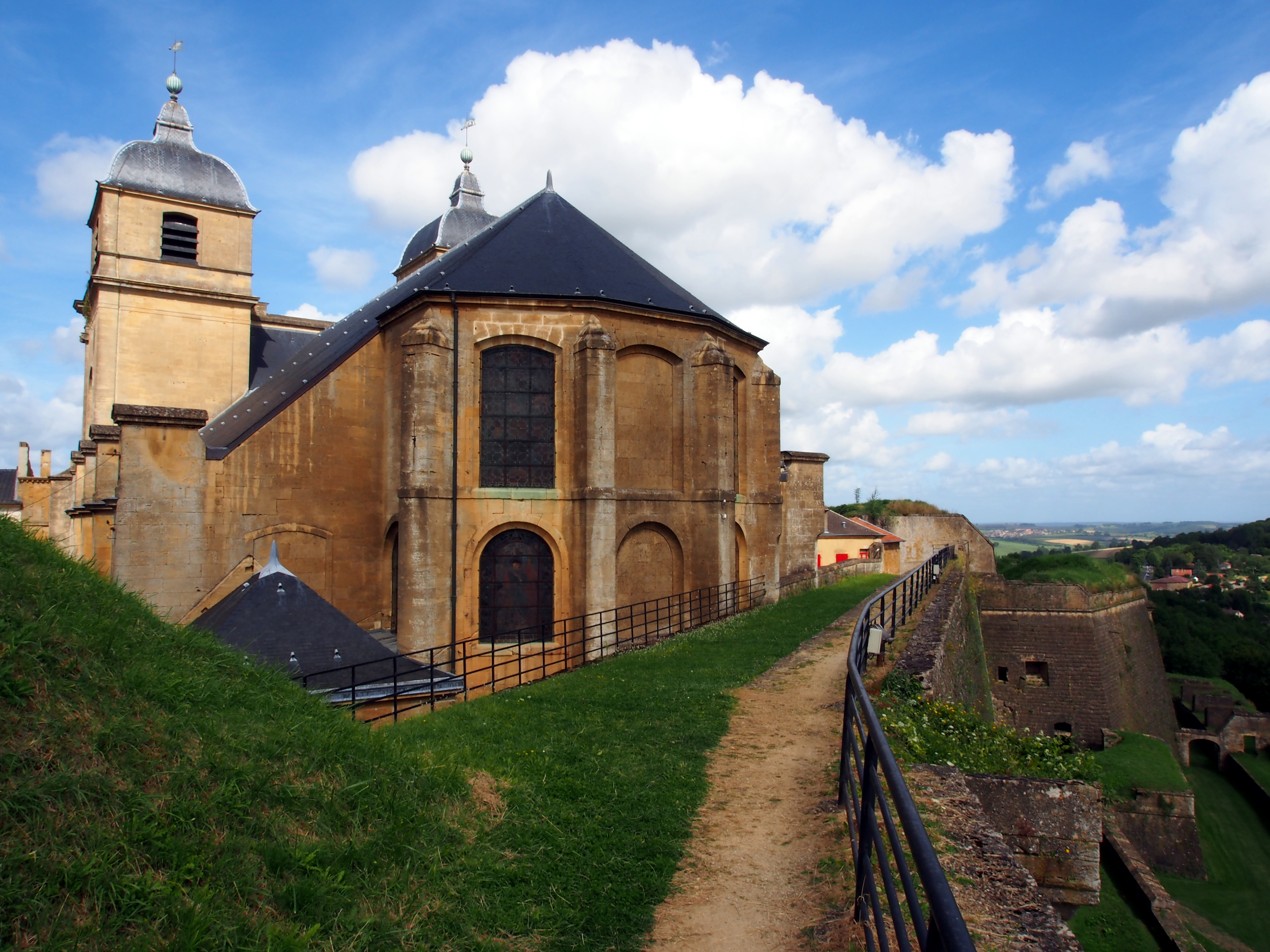
Saint-Martin church in the citadel of Montmédy.

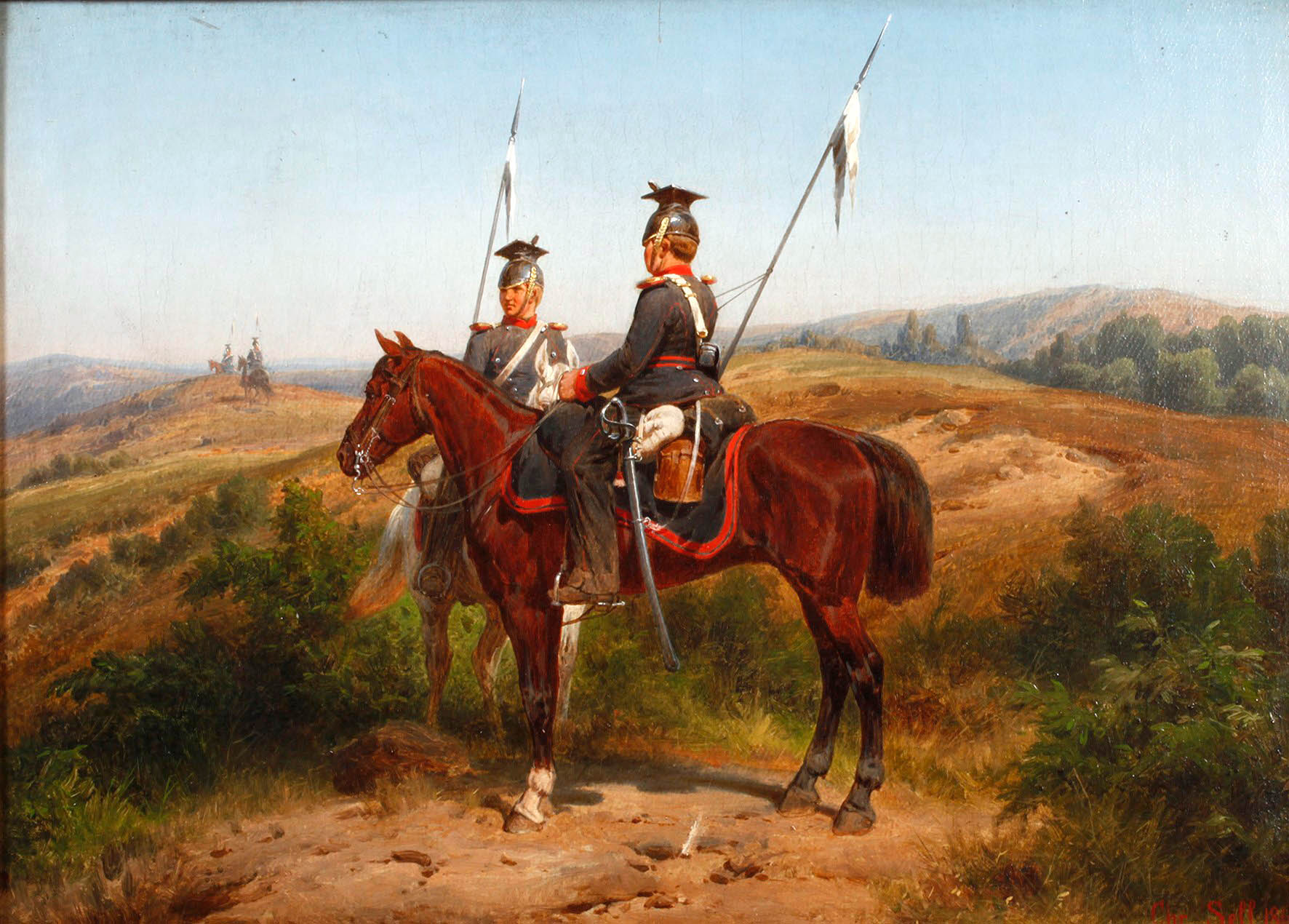
Prussian Uhlans in 1867, canvas by Christian Sell, 1867.

On July 16, three days before the declaration of war, a rumour spread that a Prussian soldier crossed the border at Sierck-les-Bains, triggering a panic. The commander gathered the inhabitants in the square and made the necessary arrangements.

The garrison, commanded by Battalion Chief Reboul, consists of a company of the 57th Infantry Regiment and 3rd Garde Mobile Battalion of the Meuse. (Note: Peter Spohr parle de deux compagnies de ce régiment, de 100 hommes chacune, voir "Geschichte der Beobachtung, Einschliessung, Belagerung und Beschiessung von Montmédy im deutsch-französischen Krieg 1870) The Garde Mobile, raised in the first weeks of the conflict, lacked training, and the place was almost devoid of qualified officers of artillery and engineers. The artillery, quite heterogeneous, consisted of 65 pieces, of which only 8 were rifled. Ammunition consists of 35,000 cannon projectiles, 40,000 kg of gunpowder, 6,300 kg of gunpowder, 116,937 cartridges for model 1866 rifle and 539,320 cartridges for 1857 model rifle.

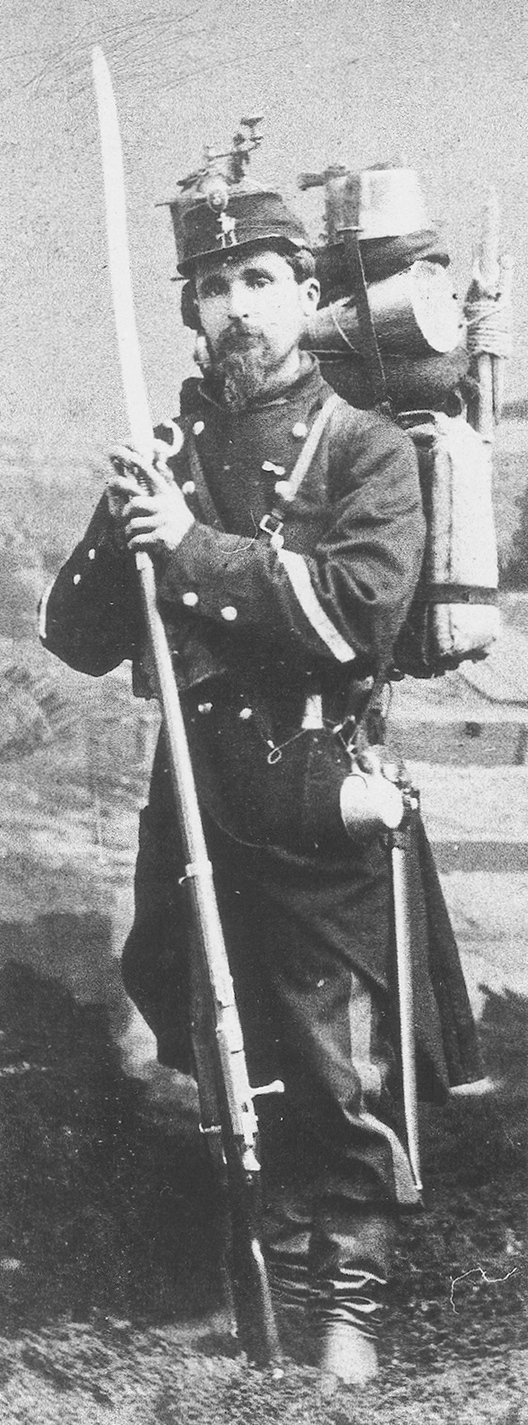
Sergeant of the Mobile National Guard, 1870–1871

In the last days of August 1870, Montmédy received considerable supplies intended for Marshal Bazaine's army and the reinforcement army which gathered around Châlons. The chief medical officer Félix Hippolyte Larrey, the chief intendant Wolf and other officers, intended to direct the services of these armies, also established themselves in Montmédy. However, after the defeat of Bazaine at the battle of Saint-Privat (August 18) and its encirclement in Metz, communications being cut, cattle and other provisions pile up in Montmédy. For lack of warehouses, they were stored in the Saint-Martin church and other improvised premises where they remain until the town's capitulation. During the following days, the garrison was joined by 700 nurses for the Army of Châlons and by several small detachments of gendarmes from neighbouring towns: it reached a total strength of 2,500 to 3,000 men. The station houses 7 or 8 locomotives and 200 wagons.

On August 27, the garrison learns that the railway from Mézières to Thionville is cut. It receives the support of part of a company from the 6th Infantry Regiment, which came from Mézières. On August 30, Near Chauvency-le-Château, a skirmish pits the 6th Regiment's vanguard against a detachment of fighters of the Bavarian Army: French infantry, threatened with encirclement, is saved by the arrival of reinforcements from Montmédy via rail. The fight left 7 or 8 killed and 15 wounded on the French side, 2 killed, and 4 wounded on the Bavarian side. According to Peter Spohr, the German detachment was the XII (1st Royal Saxon) Corps' vanguard, including a company of the 13th Regiment and a squadron of the 2nd Cavalry Regiment; the Saxons destroy the installations of the Chauvency station (telegraph, water tank, etc.); they lost one killed, and one wounded and took 11 French prisoners including a captain.

On September 1, the Montmédy garrison heard the violent cannonade to the north. They learn the next day that Marshal Patrice de MacMahon's army, coming from Châlons, has delivered and was off the loss at the Battle of Sedan with the following day being that a Saxon officer sent by the Royal Prince Albert of Saxony comes to inform the commander of Montmédy of the French defeat and to ask him very politely to surrender, which the commander Reboul refuses in the forms: "Sir, you know like me that ' a place of war cannot be surrendered without defending itself; take it if you can.".

On September 3, A Prussian officer of the 3rd Guard Uhlans Regiment appears in the name of Prince Hohenlohe to demand surrender again. A French infantryman, who had neither seen the white flag nor heard the order not to shoot, fires and killed a Prussian trumpet. Commander Reboul apologizes and promises to punish the guilty soldier severely. He again refuses to surrender, even when the Prussian emissary informs him that MacMahon is killed (in fact, he is only wounded) and that Emperor Napoleon III and a large part of the army have been captured by Prussians.

== Siege ==
=== Bombardment on September 5 ===
On September 4, Prince Albert, commander of the 12th Army Corps, ordered Prince Hohenlohe to undertake the siege of Montmedy. It provides the following units:

- 2nd Guard Infantry Brigade (General von Medem)
- 6 squadrons of the 1st to 3rd Guards Uhlans
- 1st Guard Division's artillery
- 1st Company of Guard Pioneers
- Pontonier detachment

On September 5 in the morning, patrols of Prussian cavalry come to observe the French defences: around 9 am, some shellfire removed them. The Prussian artillery immediately began to bombard the city, an exceptional practice at that time and for which the French were ill-prepared. The mobile guards who tried to gain their positions were hampered by the influx of distraught women and children who took refuge in the casemates. The French only had one gun available capable of firing on Prussian batteries. The church, the town hall and the sub-prefecture are affected. Fires broke out which the French were unable to control. Around noon, the Prussian artillery ceased bombarding. An emissary, Thonnelle's mayor, comes to bring a message from the Prince of Hohenlohe with a new request for surrender, which was rejected like the previous offers.

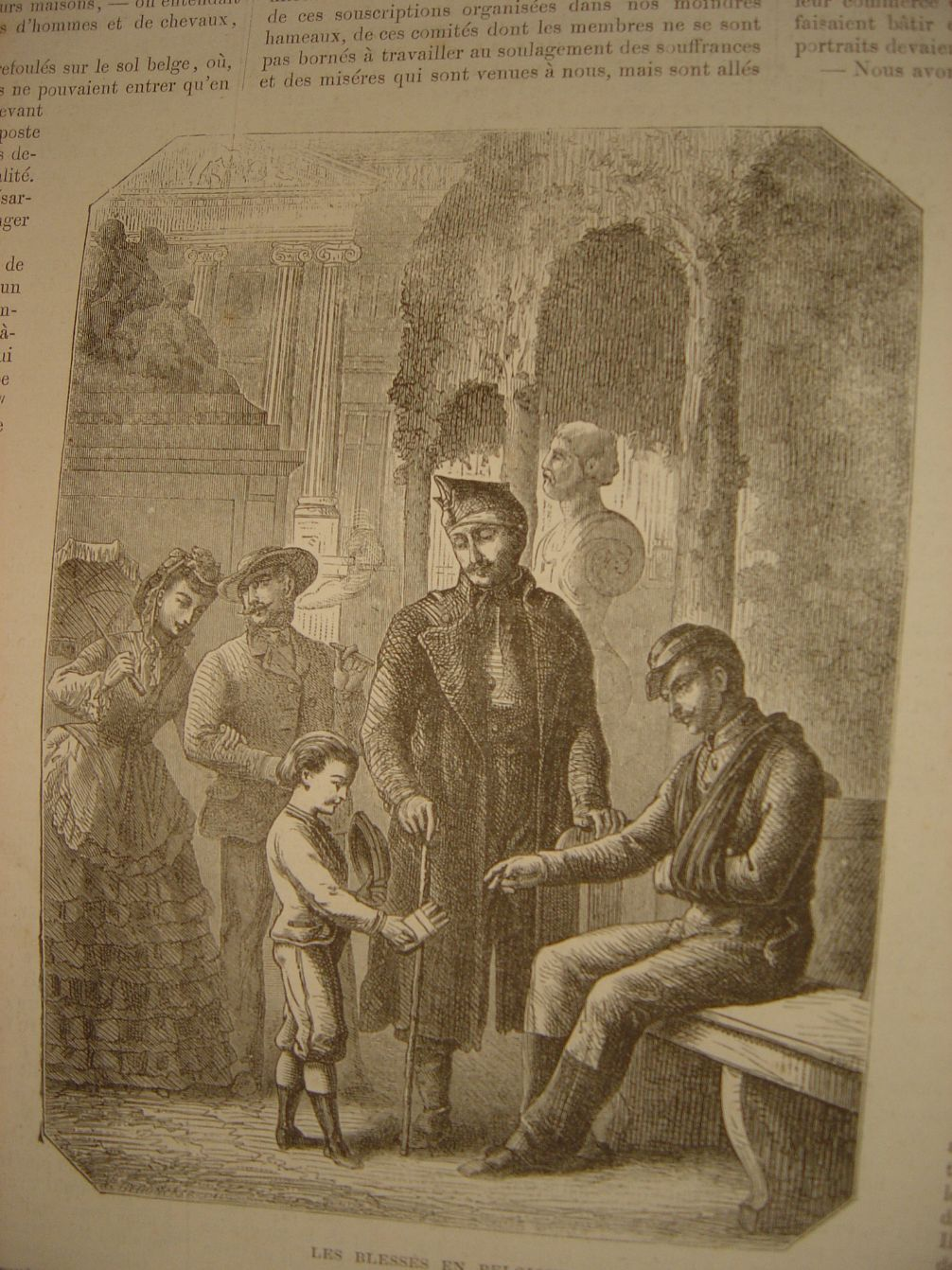
French wounded evacuated to Belgium, engraving from L'Illustration européenne, 1870

The bombardment resumed in the afternoon with greater precision. Two-thirds of houses and all public buildings were damaged, and a fire in a fodder warehouse raised fears of an explosion in a nearby powder magazine. While the French guns, moved during the midday truce, opened fire on the Prussian positions, the soldiers hardly managed to contain the fire, which would last another week. The bombardment stops around 6 p.m. In total, the French lost 3 killed (including a civilian) and 19 wounded, 4 of whom will die of their injuries. Most civilian houses were damaged, but the bombardment, carried out with field pieces, hardly affected the ramparts. On September 6, the Prussians withdrew without resuming the bombardment. A large part of the civilian population leaves the city for refuge in Belgium; the soldiers recover the abandoned houses.

=== The output in September and October ===
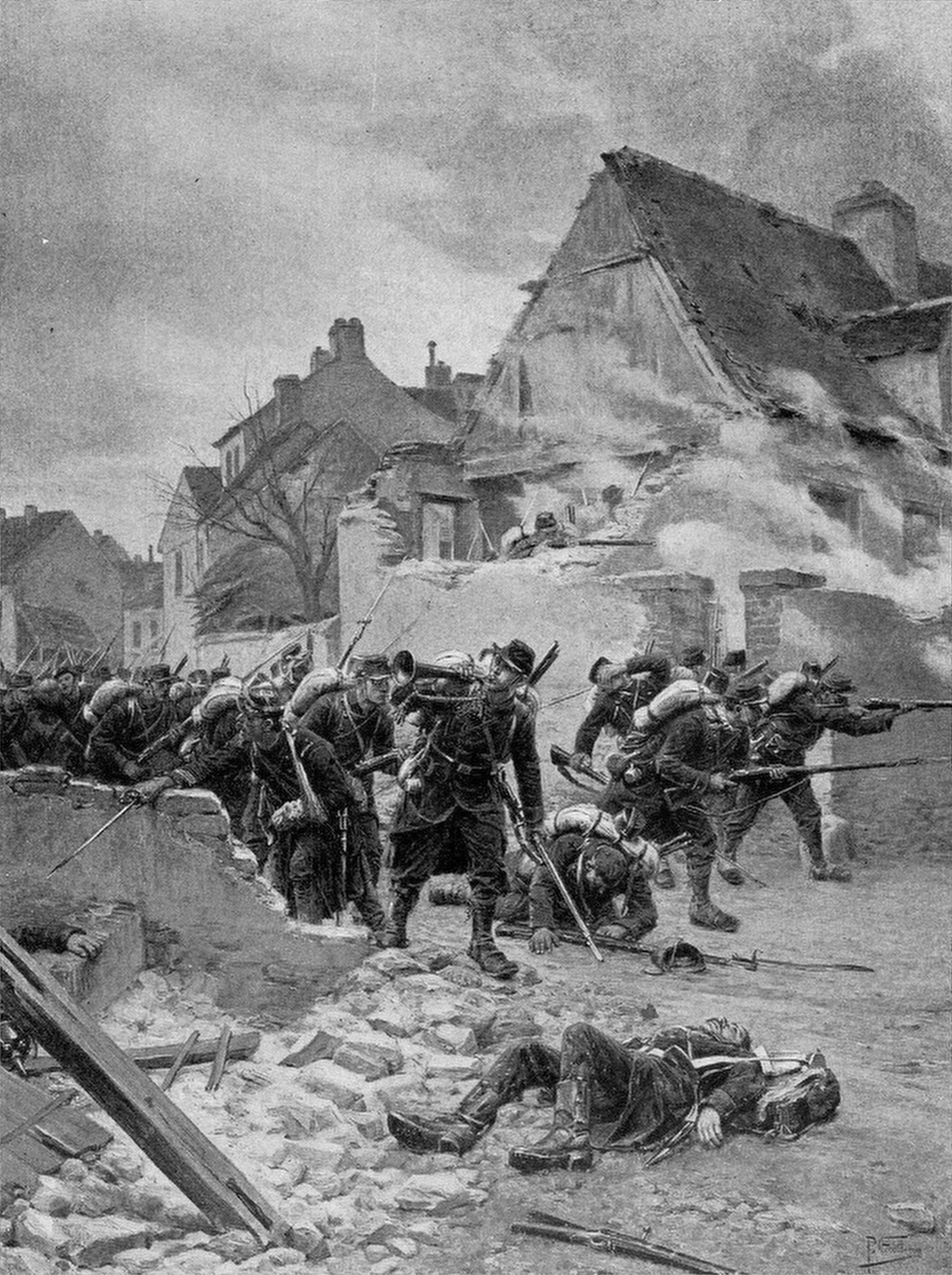
Fight in a village; canvas by Paul-Louis-Narcisse Grolleron (1848-1901)

From September 6, the small German garrisons of the Meuse pass under General von Bothmer, who directed the siege of Verdun. The German 65th Regiment is shared between Damvillers, Stenay and Étain. The Chief Surgeon Larrey, Intendant General Wolf and other officers leave Montmédy to join Paris. About 2,000 soldiers were captured during the fighting at Beaumont (August 30), And Sedan (September 1st) managed to escape and reach Montmedy. Still, most were demoralized and lacking equipment but didn't stay out and prefer instead to join the Army of the Loire that the Government of National Defense is in the process of constituting further south. As a result, only 600 newcomers remained in place and, despite a certain relaxation of discipline, constituted a valuable supplement for the garrison. An escaped artillery lieutenant works to improve the firing positions of the place but, following a series of quarrels, leaves the city after a month to join the Army of the North. On September 11, the locomotives and wagons are assembled in the railway tunnel, the two ends of which are blown up to prevent the enemy from seizing them.

Columns of French prisoners of war heading east passed not far from Montmédy, along the wooded roads conducive to ambushes. On the night of September 12 to 13, a company of 200 infantry is sent to try to deliver them. After a march in the rain, the French arrived in position near Stenay, but an Algerian rifleman, firing before the order, gave the convoy the alert and thwarted the attack. On September 17, a detachment of 200 men was sent searching for enemy scouts near Chauvency. They didn't find them but decided to attack the German garrison of Stenay. Encountering by chance on his way a convoy of a hundred Germans with two vans, he changes his plans and attacks the convoy: he captures 40 soldiers and an officer, the rest fleeing to Damvillers. These troops belonged to the 53rd Landwehr Regiment.

On October 4, following the attack on a train of troops by the inhabitants of Thonne-le-Thil, the German command ordered, as a punitive measure, a requisition of the surrounding villages. In reaction, on October 5, The French undertake a new release with a detachment of 400 men to intercept the requisition convoy escorted by two or three hundred Saxons of the 65th Regiment. These soldiers, faster than expected, exceeded the ambush point. When the French realized, a company of 150 men of the 57th Zouave Regiment pursued the Saxons and dispersed them without being able to catch up. The French then fell back on the main part of their detachment and set out again towards Chauvency, exchanging shots with German reinforcements from Stenay. The only result of these actions was that they kept the Germans on the alert and hindered their operations requisition.

On October 7, Commander Reboul concludes a prisoner exchange with the Germans: the 27 German soldiers detained at Montmédy are exchanged for an equal number of Zouaves captured at the Siege of Paris, in transit at Stenay during their movement to Germany. The French learned a few days later that a small garrison no longer held the town of Stenay and that it was a favourable opportunity to seize it. Accordingly, on the night of October 11 to 12, a detachment of 300 men is sent to Stenay. The German soldiers caught off guard, were either captured or fled: the French left around 6:30 am with 200 prisoners with 14 horses and 7 vans taken from the enemy, hurrying to avoid meeting German troops coming from Mouzon, Ardennes and which was to arrive in Stenay around 8 am. The French were back in Montmédy with their prisoners in 10 hours. They also picked up important booty Chassepot rifles, warm blankets and other equipment.

=== Failed attempt to retake Sedan ===
The German command, furious at its failure at Stenay, imposed a large contribution on the inhabitants and transferred its stopover service to Damvillers, further away from Montmédy. The withdrawal of the Montmédy garrison raised the morale of the troops: the Belgian border was virtually no longer monitored by the Germans for 40 to 60 km, which made it possible to receive mail and news from France via Belgium. 650 soldiers from the nursing and administrative services who were of little use on the spot were sent back to Lille, crossing the border illegally.

However, Achille Testelin, National Defense Commissioner appointed to the Directorate of the Northern Forces, received unfavourable reports on Commander Reboul's conduct and ordered him to be dismissed from his post. He designates replacing a captain of the 57th Regiment with the order to mount an attack against Sedan. The new commander of the Place de Montmédy brings together a force of thousand men who were ordered to attack Sedan from the east. At the same time, the garrison of Mézières would make an exit and attack from the west. In addition, the commander was counting on an uprising of the inhabitants of Sedan, who were very dissatisfied with the German occupation. However, the secret of Beaumont and Boulzicourt, which brings their forces to 6,000 men. On October 21, The plan of attack is cancelled and restored by Commissioner Reboul in office.

=== The snipers ===
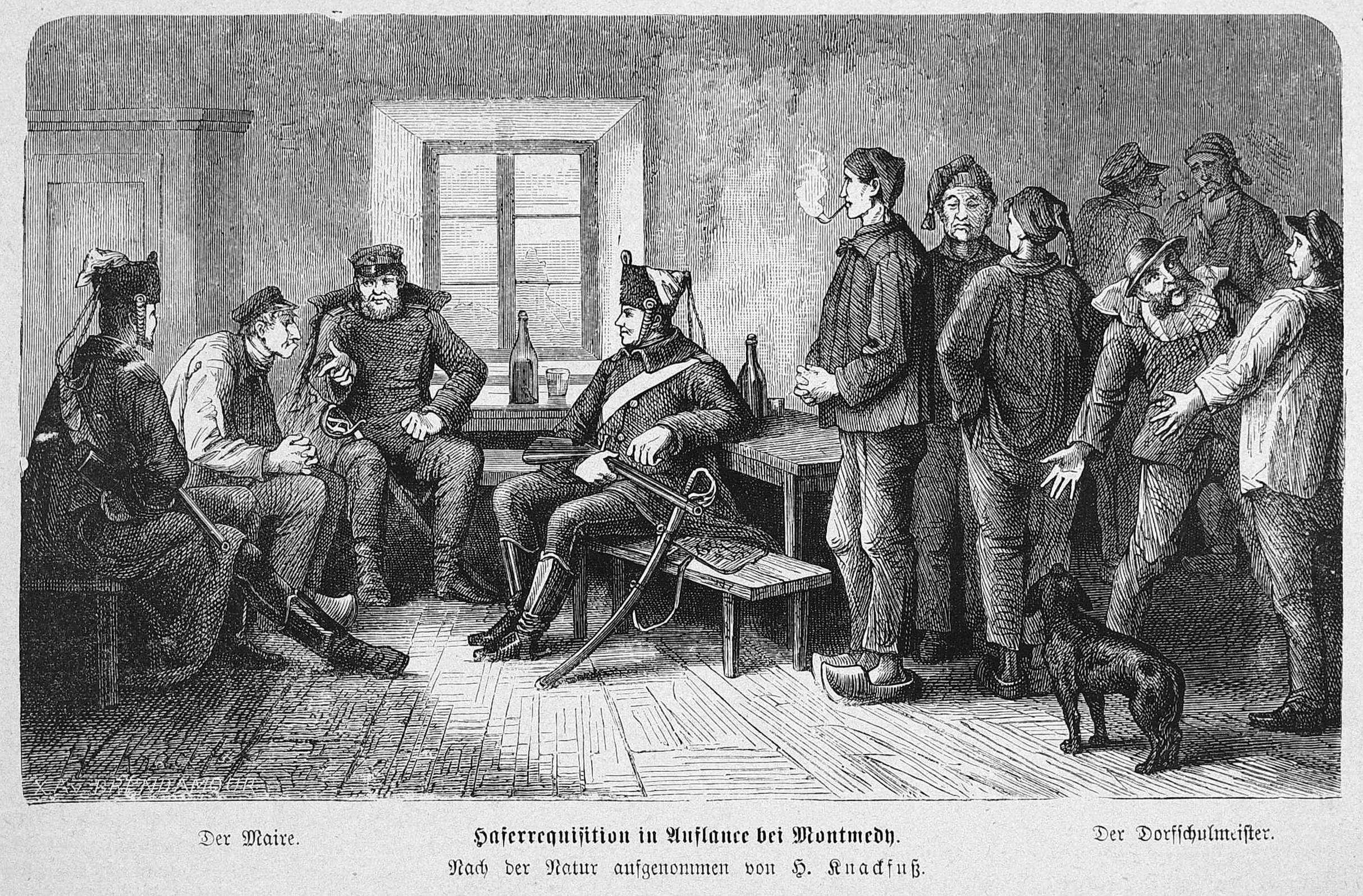
Requisitions from the peasants near Montmédy, Die Gartenlaube, 1871

The Government of National Defense, led by Léon Gambetta, calls for the creation of free corps (or companies) of snipers intended to harass the enemy: "That each Frenchman receive or take a rifle, and that he is put at the disposal of the authority: the fatherland is in danger!". These volunteers appear in the Ardennes from August 1870 and multiplied after the disaster of the Imperial German Army, renewing a practice well known in border regions since the invasions of 1814 and 1815. Among these improvised units are the Scouts of the Ardennes, Chasseurs de l'Argonne, Montagnards de Revin, Corps franc de Vosges, and other units.

At Montmédy, towards the end of September, a lieutenant proposed to form a franc-tireur company of 40 or 60 men, raised among the isolated soldiers coming from other units. Commander Reboul accepts the principle, but the municipal council refuses to finance it. Then, towards the middle of October, another improvised leader took the lead of a company of snipers who raised among the isolated: A. de Lort-Sérignan, an officer of the regular army, was very critical of this troop which 'he presents as a band of looters, "confined in villages where their name, sad thing to say, was more feared than that of the enemy", ransoming the inhabitants and the travellers, avoiding any confrontation with the enemy in Sainte-Menehould and Reims. The band leader subsequently left the region and ended up as an officer of the Paris Commune in the spring of 1871.

=== "The Avalanche Came Down From Metz" ===
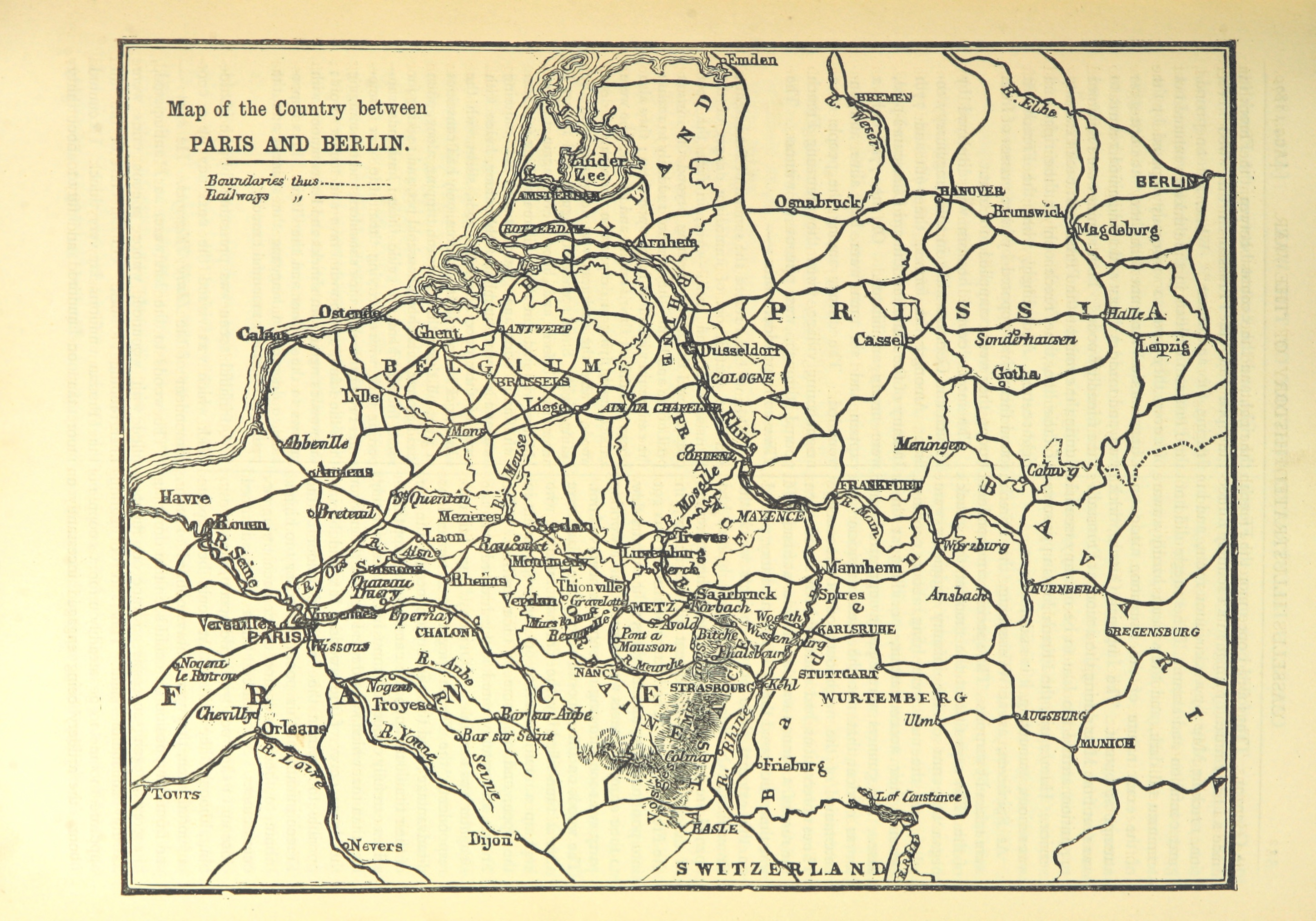
Northeastern France in 1870, Edmund Ollier, Cassell's History of the War Between France and Germany, 1870–1871, 1894

A new commander-in-chief, Battalion Commander Tessier, is appointed on October 18 and arrives in Montmédy to take up his duties, and on October 28, Reboul remaining commander of the place. The new governor, engineer officer, develops the fortifications that were still very insufficient and reorganises the troops. The isolated soldiers are regrouped in only one, the "Battalion of Montmédy" comprising 6 companies of infantry and one of cavalry. From the beginning of November, the new commander ordered daily 38 reconnaissance within a radius of 17 to 18 km.

On October 28, a detachment from Montmédy collects and brings back to safety the crew of a balloon sent by the besieged Parisians, carrying mail, carrier pigeons and a secretary of Minister Jules Favre, intended for the Army of the North. The secretary leaves the next day to reach his destination via Belgium.

However, the capitulation of Metz, signed on October 28 and announced by the Belgian newspapers in the following days, places the French in a critical situation: it allows the Germans to release 200,000 men and a powerful artillery to complete the siege of other places in the north-east of France with Verdun surrendering on November 9. On November 10, Commander Tessier ordered a small expedition to the villages of Jametz and Marville to mark the French military presence there and reattach them to the unoccupied zone in the event of an armistice. On November 13, the German 14th Division, commanded by General lieutenant Georg von Kameke, coming from Metz, moved from Thionville and surrounded Montmédy. On November 15, A French recognition came Montmédy faces the forefront of the 14th Division. Commander Tessier orders, on November 16, a local attack towards Chauvency to assess the forces available to the enemy: the latter, considerably reinforced in numbers, pushes back the French who lost 85 men. This fight puts an end to the French outings.

Between 16 and 17 November the German 27th Brigade (Colonel Pannwitz), part of the 14th Division, surrounds Montmédy in a tight circle and builds entrenchments. As a result, the city stops receiving news from the outside by Belgian newspapers. On November 19, an emissary of Colonel Pannwitz presented himself to the French lines to try to negotiate an exchange of prisoners of the 300 Prussians then being held captive in the fortress.

The winter cold began to be felt, the French garrison sent daily chores of wood in the forest of Mont Cé, exchanging rifle shots with the German infantrymen who held the other bank of the Chiers.

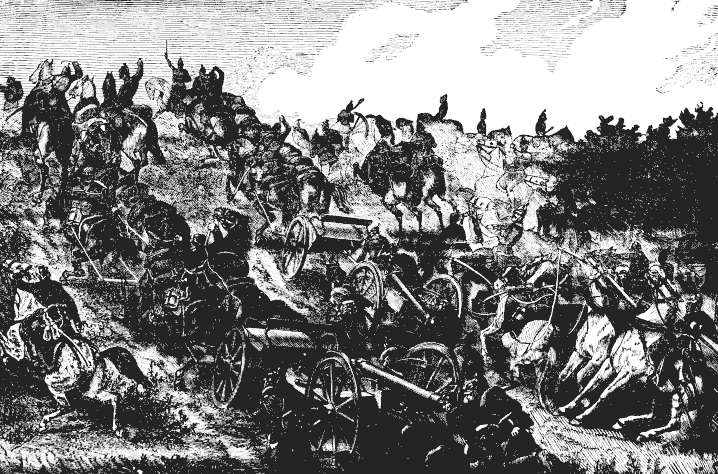
Prussian artillery of the war of 1870–1871, Edmund Ollier, Cassell's History of the War Between France and Germany, 1870–1871, 1894

Thionville, after three days of intensive bombardment, surrendered on November 24. The 14th Division was concentrated around Montmédy. A large artillery force was moved from Thionville to Longuyon by rail, and from there to Montmédy by road, which made the trip difficult by the floods and cuts operated by the French garrison. The German pioneers built new bridges to replace those destroyed by the French. In 13 days, with the help of requisitioned peasants and farm horses, the firing positions were fitted out, and the guns were emplaced. A telegraph line connected the batteries. The besieging forces include:

- 10 infantry battalions
- 2 cavalry squadrons
- 5 pioneer companies
- 5 field artillery batteries of 9 and 8 cm

Heavy artillery:

- 4 rifled mortars of 21 cm
- 10 cannons of 24 cm long
- 10 cannons of 24 cm short
- 20 rifled guns with 12 cm siege.

=== Bombardment and capitulation ===
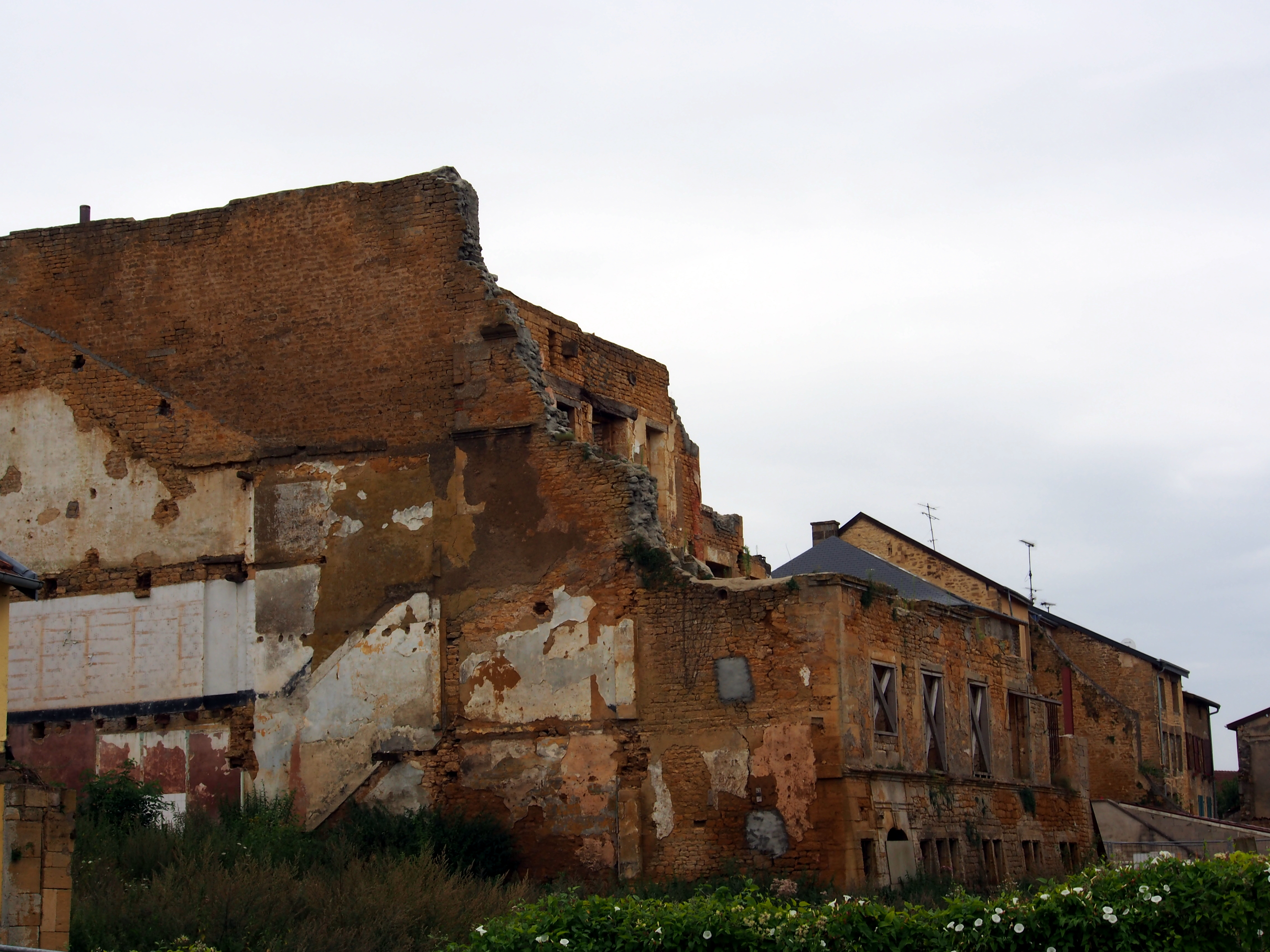
The Citadel of Montmédy in 2015

From December 9, the German artillery begins to bombard the lines of the French, considerably hampering their work of fortification. On the French side, only two pieces of 24 and six of 12 striped have sufficient range for a counter-battery fire: they do not come into action until December 11. Finally, General von Kameke sends a proposal for a capitulation or, failing that, an exchange of prisoners, which are refused.

On the night of December 11 to the 12th, the Germans begin to cut down the trees and bring the guns closer to their firing position. From December 12 to around 7:30 am, the general bombardment begins. The German heavy artillery pieces fire with great precision, forcing the soldiers and the hospitalized wounded to take refuge in the casemates. The firing of the field pieces is much more haphazard in the first hours, much more haphazard. The French artillery responded with some success, the heights serving as a firing position for the Prussians being perfectly known and mapped. 400 German prisoners are held in the municipal prison, and there is insufficient space to house them in the casemates. The French discover the new pieces of German heavy artillery for the first time, notably the 21 cm rifled mortar, whose range and power exceed those of older pieces. The bombardment is interrupted during the night; the French took the opportunity to treat their wounded and repair their damaged facilities. However, the looting of cellars by soldiers put large quantities of wine and alcohol into circulation, which severely compromised discipline.

On December 13 and 14th, the fog made aiming impossible. It condemned the French artillery to inaction, while the German fire, falling over the entire surface of the city, caused significant losses. Several fires broke out without the means of controlling them. In addition, 21 German shells began to breach the armoured doors of the powder magazine, threatening the fortress with a general explosion. Commander Tessier summons all the officers and the artillery non-commissioned officers who conclude that the place can only receive blows without returning them and that it is useless to leave the artillerymen on the ramparts, from where they could not target the enemy. Around 5:00 p.m., seeing no way out, Commander Tessier decided to capitulate. It acts in contradiction with the military regulation of 1863, which prohibits a commander of the place, under penalty of death and degradation, to surrender as long as his fortress does not repel at least one ground assault making a breach.

During the night of 13 to December 14, while the disorders worsen in the city and that the soldiers, often drunk, are on the verge of the mutiny, the commander Reboul and another emissary, by different paths, are sent to the Prussian lines to ask to capitulate. They are brought to the German command to Iré-le-Sec: Major von Hilger, Chief of Staff of the 14th Division, telegraphed immediately to batteries the order to cease fire. Capitulation, concluded on December 14 at 2:00 a.m., with it later ratified at 8:00 a.m. by General von Kameke.

The act of capitulation specifies that the French troops would have to leave the city at 1:00 pm by the Porte de Metz, laying down their arms; The French officers will remain in the city before they too are sent into captivity; The line troops and the Mobile National Guard would be prisoners of war but that the sedentary National Guard will be released against a written engagement. The military doctors will remain in place to continue their service. All the material, armament, provisions, horses, archives will be handed over to the Prussians as they were at the time of the signing of the convention.

== Aftermath ==
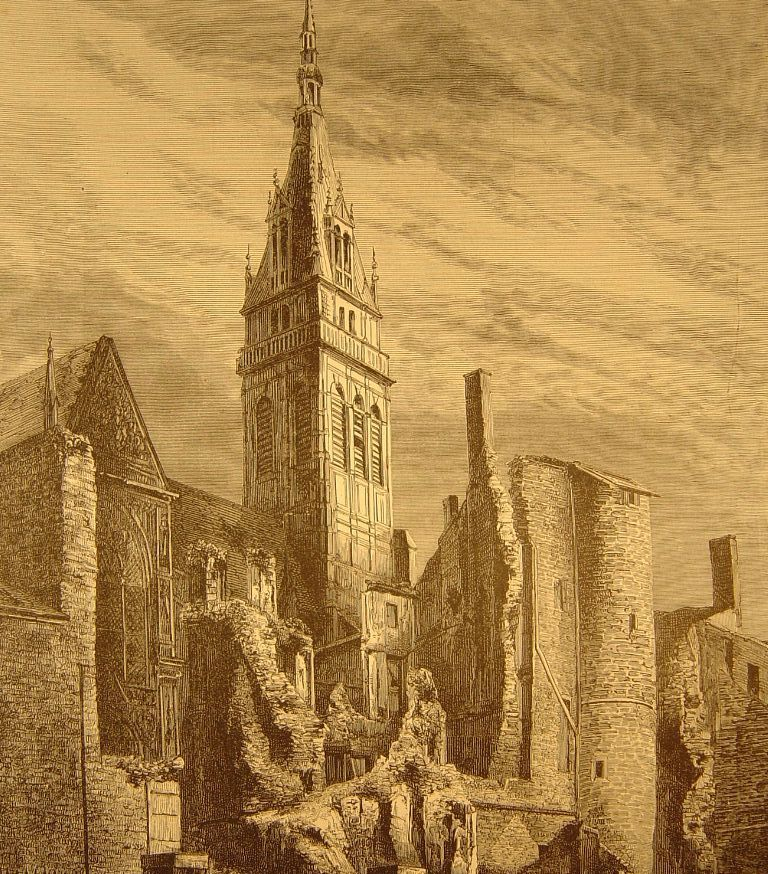
The Mézières cathedral after the bombing, engraving from L'Illustration européenne, 1870

Mézières, a town of 6,000 inhabitants with stronger fortifications than those of Montmédy, is completely surrounded by November 16. After the capitulation of Montmédy, on December 14, the heavy artillery used against it is transferred to Mézières. Finally, after 30 hours of intensive bombardment, the city capitulated, with the Prussians entering it on January 7, 1871, at noon. The fall of Montmédy gave the Germans control of the railway from Sedan to Thionville, which enabled them to supply the Picardy front. After the war, Commander Tessier had to go before a board of inquiry to justify having signed the surrender of Montmédy. Finally, on January 18, 1872, the board concludes,

The damage caused in the city and to the military buildings by enemy fire, the impossibility of the place to respond to it with the two pieces of 24 which were in battery and had sufficient range, the fear of seeing the powder magazines jump, determined Commander Tessier to give up the place without any request having been made in this direction by the municipal council, nor the inhabitants of Montmédy. The Board of Inquiry thinks that Commander Tessier prolonged his resistance as much as his means allowed him but that he was wrong not to destroy his artillery, arms and ammunition before the surrender was signed of any kind enclosed in place.

== Bibliography ==
- Barry, Quintin (2014). The Somme 1870–71: The Winter Campaign in Picardy. Solihull: Helion & Cy. OCLC 908197756.
- de Lort-Sérignan, A. (1873). Le blocus de Montmédy en 1870 [The Siege Of Montmédy in 1870] (in French). Paris: Publication de la réunion des officiers. OCLC 457611951.
- "L'illustration". L'Illustration. 57. Paris: J.-J. Dubochet. 1871. ISSN 0246-9251.
- Moltke, Helmuth von (2016). La Guerre de 1870. Translated by Jaeglé, Ernest. Paris: Collection XIX. ISBN 978-2-34-608298-8.
- Ollier, Edmund (1899). Cassell's History of the War between France and Germany, 1870–1871. London: Cassell. OCLC 6931730.
- Spohr, Peter (1877). Geschichte der Beobachtung, Einschliessung, Belagerung und Beschiessung von Montmédy im deutsch-französischen Krieg 1870–71 [History of the Observation, Encirclement, Siege and Bombardment of Montmédy in the German–French War 1870–71] (in German). Berlin: Vossische Buchhandlung. OCLC 67295892.
