= Frederick Tomlins =

Frederick Tomlins may refer to:

- Freddie Tomlins (1919–1943), British figure skater
- Frederick Guest Tomlins (1804–1867), English journalist
