= Siege of Thionville =

The siege of Thionville may refer to one of five sieges of the French town of Thionville:

- Siege of Thionville (1558), France takes the city from Spain, but returns the city in the Treaty of Cateau-Cambrésis (1559)
- Siege of Thionville (1639), failed French siege against Spain
- Siege of Thionville (1643), France takes the city from Spain
- Siege of Thionville (1792), failed Austrian siege against France
- Siege of Thionville (1870), Germany takes the city from France
