= Siege of Mézières (1870–1871) =

Battle during the Franco-Prussian War

- Part of Franco-Prussian War
Date	17 November 1870 – 2 January 1871
Location	Mézières-en-Gâtinais, Loiret, France
Result	German Victory

Belligerents
French Republic	North German Confederation: Prussia

Commanders and leaders
Colonel Vernet	Georg von Kameke; Wilhelm von Woyna

Units involved
Armée de la Loire	14th Division

Strength
2,000 Infantry	Unknown

Casualties and losses
98 officers and 2,000 soldiers were captured, 106 artillery pieces, many military reserves and ammunition depots were seized	Unknown

The siege of Mézières was a siege battle during the Franco-Prussian War. It took place from 17 November 1870 until 2 January 1871 in Mézières-en-Gâtinais, which is located by the river Meuse in France. After suffering from a German artillery strike, the French army at Mézières, under the command of Colonel Vernet, surrendered to Germany under the command of Major General Wilhelm von Woyna on 2 January 1871. Although lasting just over a day, German artillery bombardment caused French defenders and civilians in Mézières heavy losses. With the victory, the Germans captured many French officers and soldiers, with many cannons and supplies from the enemy's reserves. Not only that, the victory at the Siege of Mézières made the German army have complete dominance of the railway line in the north extending from Metz and Mézières to Paris, capital of France.

== The battle ==
Fort Mézières was located in the northern part of France. After the defeat of the French army in the Battle of Sedan in September 1870, the German army and the defenders of France at Mézières have done agreements with each other: for those who defended the fortress, these forces supplied materials from their reserves so that the Germans kept a large number of prisoners, and thus the Germans did not attack Mézières for some time. The thing is, in the countryside around Mézières there were many franc-tireur soldiers of France. The franc-tireurs made it difficult for the Prussian wounded convoys, and had ambushed some Prussian forces in late October. Early in November, divisions of 1st Infantry of Prussia were sent to Mézières, and at the end of May, they were reinforced. In general, by mid-November, the Prussian army had more firmly encircled the fortress, and many skirmishes had occurred between the Prussian army and franc-tireur forces. For example, the Prussians fought for an army to run on the franc-tireur Rocroy, before pulling to the village and defeated the franc-tireur forces. On 19 December, after the fall of the fortress of Montmédy, the Prussian 14th Division moved in front of Mézières. On 22 December, fighting broke out between the Prussian 14th Division and franc-tireur forces. Having completely blockaded Mézières and engaged the franc-tireurs, the Prussians began to prepare for artillery fire. Initially, the commander of the siege corps was Lieutenant General Georg von Kameke, before Major General Wilhelm von Woyna took over on 25 December. When Fort Verdun surrendered, the heavy cannon loads were brought by rail from Clermont near the south side of the Mézières, and only freezing in the area prevented the Prussian army from building batteries.

Early on 31 December 1870, the Prussian cannons and field guns opened fire. Overall, the Prussian artillery force that day was a resounding success. At first, the artillery of the garrison resisted fiercely, but by the afternoon they were silenced. The town of Mézières was badly damaged. And, on the night of 1 January 1871, the French surrender was completed; on 2 January the Prussian army advanced to capture the town. After signing an agreement, most French officers were taken prisoner and were detained in Würzburg. Not long after that, the Prussians captured the fortress of Rocroi.
