= The Leader (English newspaper) =

The Leader was a radical weekly newspaper, published in London from 1850 to 1860 at a price of 6d.

== Founders ==
George Henry Lewes and Thornton Leigh Hunt founded The Leader in 1850. They had financial backing from Edmund Larken, who was an unconventional clergyman looking for a vehicle for "Christian liberal" views. Others involved were George Dawson and Richard Congreve. After a year Larken and Holyoake took over the rest of the shares.

== Contributors ==
Lewes contributed theatre criticism under the pseudonym 'Vivian'. Later editors appear to have included Edward Frederick Smyth Pigott (proprietor from the end of 1851 to 1860) and Frederick Guest Tomlins. Contributors included Thomas Spencer Baynes, Wilkie Collins, George Eliot, Andrew Halliday, the future theatre manager John Hollingshead (1827–1904), the future politician James Mackenzie Maclean (1835–1906), the future anthropologist John McLennan, Gerald Massey, the art critic Henry Merritt (1822–1877), Edmund Ollier (1826–1886), Herbert Spencer, and the political journalist Edward Michael Whitty (1827–1860). The paper carried correspondence from William Edward Forster (proposing state farms and workshops) and Barbara Bodichon (on prostitution).
