= Withey =

Withey is a surname. Notable people with the surname include:

- Chester Withey (1887–1939), American actor, film director and screenwriter
- Graham Withey (born 1960), English footballer
- Graydon G. Withey (1910–1994), judge of the United States Tax Court
- Henry Franklin Withey (1880-1969), American architect
- Jeff Withey (born 1990), American basketball player
- Russell Withey (born 1991), Botswana cricketer
- Solomon Lewis Withey (1820–1886), American judge

== See also ==
- Jim McWithey (1927–2009), American racing driver
- Wittey
