= Witty =

Witty may refer to:

- Witty (surname), a list of people with the name
- Witty (computer worm)
- Witty (software), a Twitter client
- Witty, Missouri, an unincorporated community in the United States

== See also ==
- Whitty, surname
- Wit (disambiguation)
- Wt (web toolkit), a web framework for C++
