= Siege of Thionville (1870) =

1870 battle of the Franco-Prussian War

- Part of Franco-Prussian War
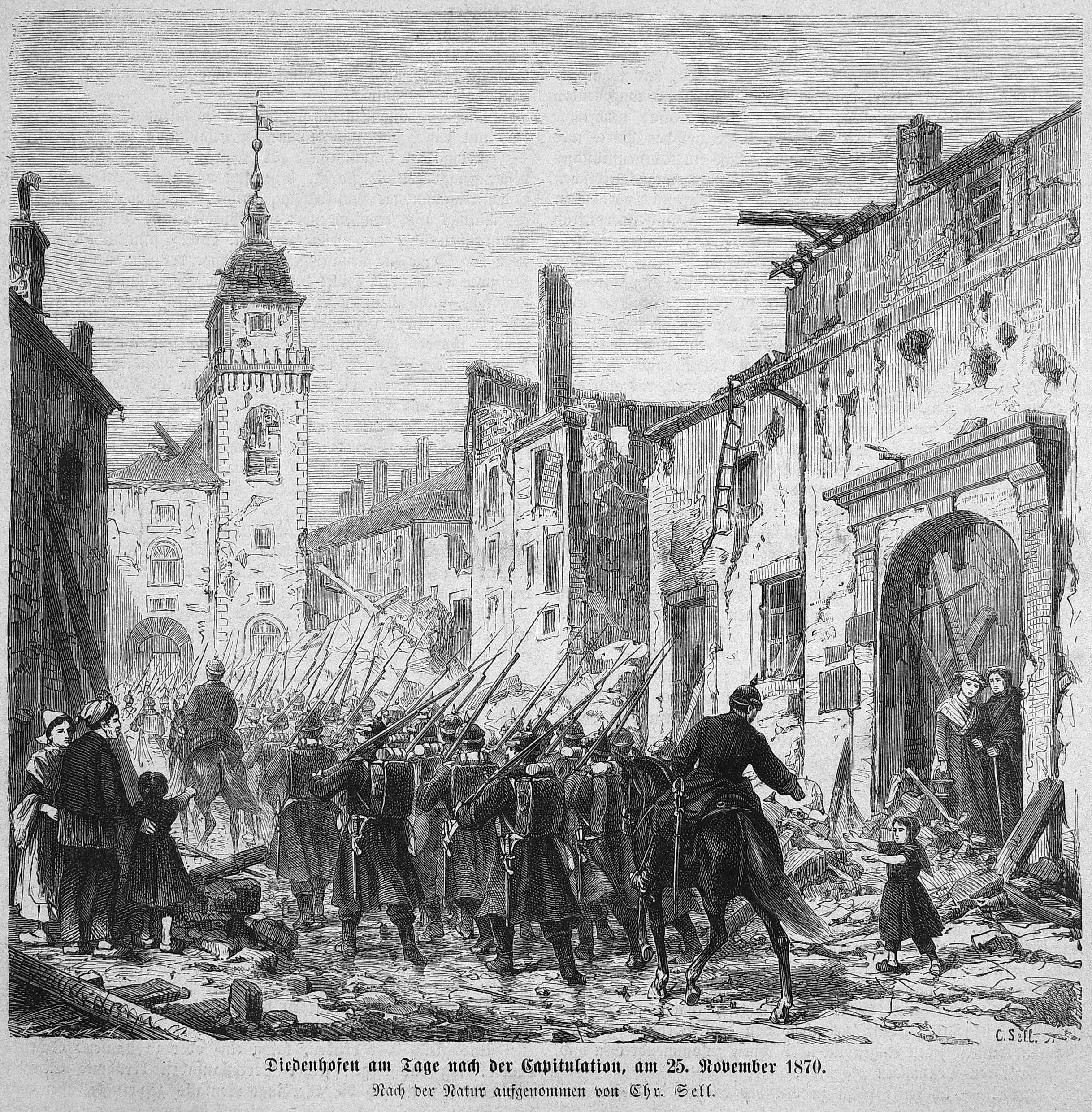
- The Prussians entering the town of Thionville the day after the town surrendered
Date	13 – 24 November 1870
Location	Thionville, Moselle, France 49°21′29″N 6°10′06″E
Result	German victory

Belligerents
French Republic	North German Confederation: Prussia

Commanders and leaders
Maurice Turnier	Georg von Kameke; Heinrich von Zastrow

Units involved
French National Guard	14th Infantry Division

Strength
Unknown	13 Infantry Companies, 5 Artillery and 7 Engineers

Casualties and losses
4,000 – 6,000 captured 200 – 250 cannons seized	Unknown
- Location within France

The siege of Thionville took place within the Franco-Prussian War. It occurred in Thionville of the Moselle from 13 to 24 November 1870. The small French garrison repulsed an attempted attack on 14 August. The garrison was subjected to a blockade and then besieged from 13 November. After the capitulation of Metz, on 28 October 1870, the Prussians moved part of their powerful artillery to Thionville. Bombed from 22 November, the square surrendered on 24 November. The capture of Thionville and that of Montmédy a month later gave the Germans control of the railway to the Picardy front.

== The siege ==
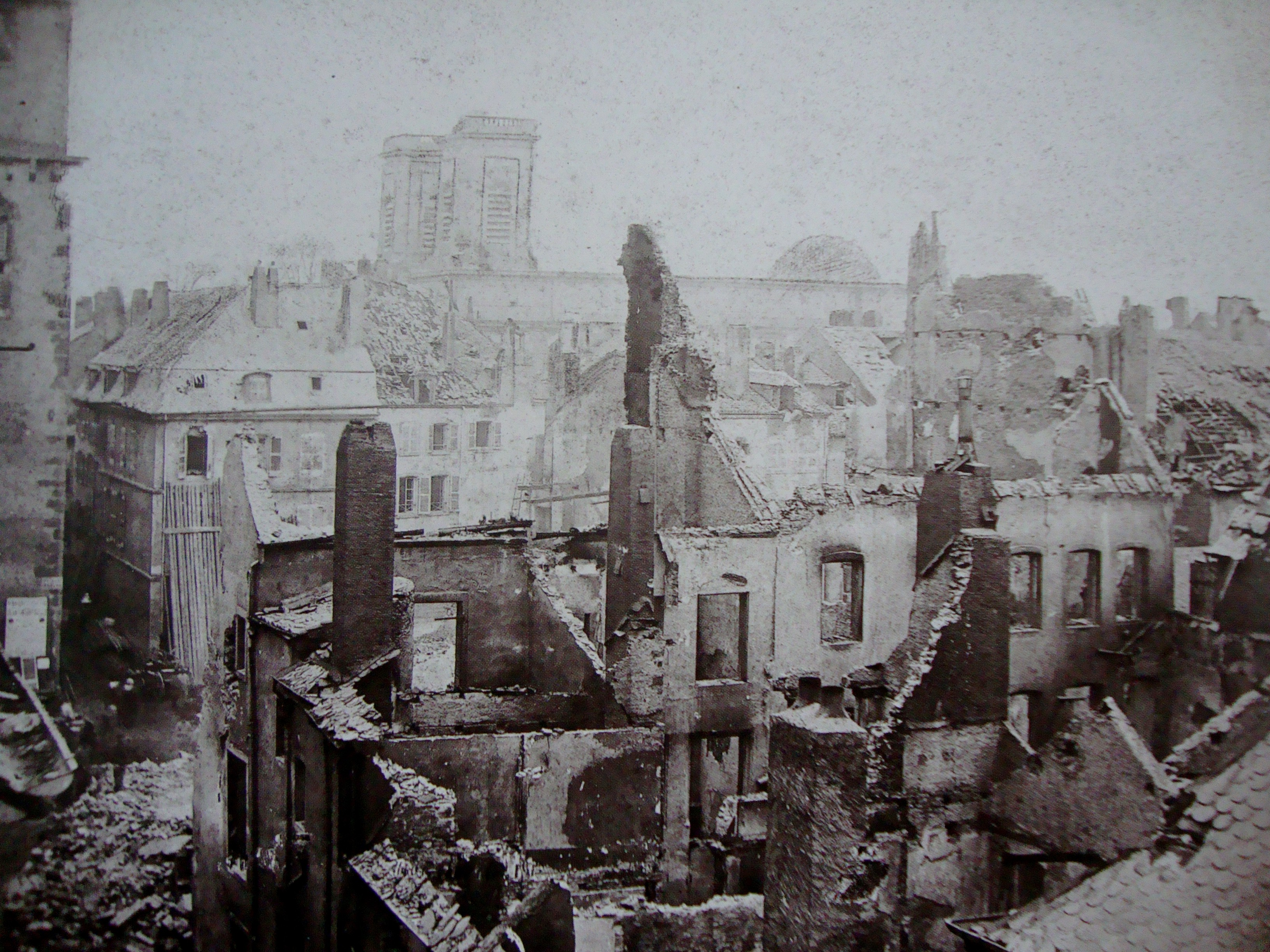
Thionville after the siege of the town

At the start of the war, the small fortress of Thionville was put under siege in July 1870. It served as a supply base in the 4th Army Corps which was under General Paul de Ladmirault. Its garrison, commanded by Colonel Maurice Turnier, consisted of a National Guard battalion plus a few cuirassiers and dragoons.

On 12 August, a patrol of Prussian cuirassiers made a reconnaissance near a city gate to find that it was only weakly defended. They made their report to General Gneisenau who, gathering various information, concluded that the place could be taken by a helping hand. While the 3rd Cavalry Division stood remote observation, the 31st Infantry Brigade, on the night of 13-14 October, went there with ladders and explosives. Coming out of the Yutz around 3 am, the brigade ran into a French detachment which opened fire; at the same time, a Prussian scout noticed that a flooding of the Moselle made the passage impracticable for fording. The Prussians withdrew without result.

After the defeat at the Battle of Gravelotte on 18 August 1870, the main French army, commanded by Marshal Bazaine, locked itself in Metz where it was besieged by the Prussian army. The Prussians then decided to surround Thionville, defended by regular troops and mobile guards, to prevent it from supporting the Metz garrison. They sent an ultimatum to the Grand Duchy of Luxembourg which was on the border with Thionville and linked to this city by the Ardennes railway, to stop providing aid to the besieged.

The 14th Infantry Division commanded by Georg von Kameke takes position in front of the town on 13 November. The place, was lightly fortified, however it was covered by two lines of heights, floods and swamps. On 22 November the besiegers opened the bombardment with 85 artillery shelling, accompanied by an infantry attack which gave little result because of heavy rain. On 24 November the town capitulated and the Germans took 4,000 prisoners as well as 199 cannons and other important supplies.

== Aftermath ==
The French National Guards stationed were allowed to return to their homes. The German troops of Edwin von Manteuffel who surrounded Thionville were immediately assigned to the Siege of Montmédy which in turn surrendered on 14 December, giving the Germans control of the railway from Sedan to Thionville.

During the Treaty of Frankfurt (10 May 1871), Thionville was part of the territories of Alsace-Lorraine ceded to the German Empire. Part of the city's population emigrated to France as they didn't want to become German citizens.
