= Charles Ollier =

English publisher and author

Charles Ollier (1788–1859) was an English publisher and writer, associated with the works of Percy Bysshe Shelley and John Keats.

== Early life ==
From a Huguenot background, Ollier began life in the banking-house of Messrs. Coutts. About 1816 he was in business as a publisher in Vere Street, Bond Street, in partnership with his brother James, who was more the man of business.

== Publisher ==
Ollier made the acquaintance of Leigh Hunt, and undertook the publication of some of his works: Foliage, Hero and Leander, and the second edition of The Story of Rimini. Through Hunt, Ollier became known to John Keats, and volunteered to publish his first poems (1817). The book did not succeed, however, and Keats quarrelled with him, publishing his subsequent books with Taylor & Hessey.

Shelley was more constant, although he objected to Ollier's insistence on the alterations which converted Laon and Cythna into The Revolt of Islam. All the subsequent works of Shelley published in his lifetime, except Swellfoot the Tyrant, were brought out by Ollier. Shelley's letters to Ollier are published in the Shelley Memorials.

The most important of Ollier's other publications were the collected works of Charles Lamb and several of Barry Cornwall's early volumes. In 1819 he published The Literary Pocket Book, in which Shelley's poem of Marianne's Dream was first printed.

In 1820 Ollier brought out Ollier's Literary Miscellany, with an article on the German drama by Julius Hare, and The Four Ages of Poetry by Thomas Love Peacock. The latter provoked Shelley's A Defence of Poetry, given to Ollier for the second part of the Miscellany, which never appeared. When Ollier's business was wound up shortly afterwards, the Defence came into the possession of John Hunt; he prepared it for publication in The Liberal, but that periodical also expired before it could be published.

Ollier became, and long continued as, a literary adviser to Richard Bentley.

In a letter to Hunt, Ollier wrote that his son William (reportedly a journalist with a fascination for etymology) coined ghoti, a comical respelling of the word fish.

== Death ==
Ollier died at Old Brompton on 5 June 1859. Edmund Ollier the journalist was his son.

== Works ==
Ollier published:

- Altham and his Wife: A Domestic Tale, 1818.
- Inesilla; or the Tempter: a Romance, with other Tales, 1824.
- Ferrers, 1842, a romance on the execution of Earl Ferrers in 1760, somewhat in the style of Harrison Ainsworth.
- Fallacy of Ghosts, Dreams, and Omens, with Stories of Witchcraft, Life-in-Death, and Monomania, 1848; reprinted from Ainsworth's Magazine.

Letters from Leigh Hunt suggest that Ollier wrote for the Naval and Military Gazette, as well as for Ainsworth's Magazine.

== Notes ==
Attribution

This article incorporates text from a publication now in the public domain: Lee, Sidney, ed. (1895). "Ollier, Charles". Dictionary of National Biography. Vol. 42. London: Smith, Elder & Co.
