= Michael James Whitty =

Michael James Whitty (born 1795, Nicharee, Duncormick, County Wexford – died 10 June 1873, Princes Park, Liverpool) was an Irish-born English newspaper editor and proprietor.

The son of a farmer, maltster and shipowner in the port of Wexford, his first love was journalism. He was educated at St Peter's College, Wexford. In 1821, he married Mary O'Neill in Dublin. They soon moved to London, and, eventually, to Liverpool. After serving eleven years as Chief Constable for Liverpool, he retired on 22 January 1847. He campaigned for the abolition of the Stamp Act under which newspapers were taxed. After the abolition took place, Whitty began publishing the Daily Post at one penny per copy, undercutting the incumbent best-selling Liverpudlian newspaper, the Liverpool Mercury.

Whitty died in 1873 and is buried in Anfield Cemetery. Journalist Edward Michael Whitty was his son. Actress Dame May Whitty was his granddaughter, by another son, William Alfred Whitty.
