= Montmédy =

- Commune
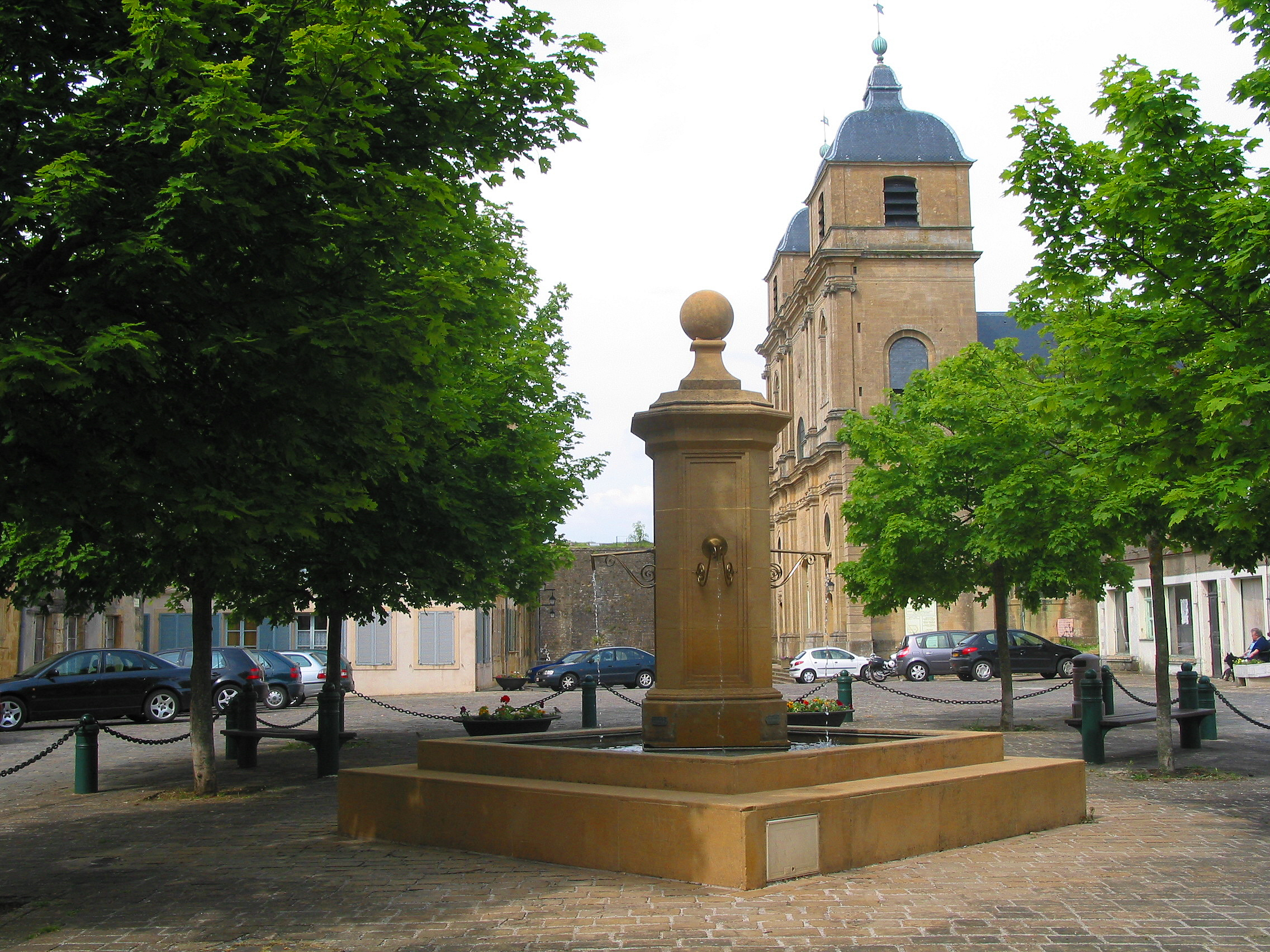
- Place de l’Hôtel de Ville: the fountain and Saint-Martin's church

- Coat of arms
- Location of Montmédy
- Location within France Location within Grand Est
- Coordinates: 49°31′13″N 5°22′00″E
- Country: France
- Region: Grand Est
- Department: Meuse
- Arrondissement: Verdun
- Canton: Montmédy
- Intercommunality: Pays de Montmédy
- Area^{1}: 23.49 km^{2} (9.07 sq mi)
- Elevation: 294 m (965 ft)
- Highest elevation: 336 m (1,102 ft)
- Lowest elevation: 177 m (581 ft)
- Population (2023): 2,052
  - Density: 87.36/km^{2} (226.3/sq mi)
- Time zone: UTC+01:00 (CET)
  - Summer (DST): UTC+02:00 (CEST)
- INSEE/Postal code: 55351 /55600
- ^{1} French Land Register data, which excludes lakes, ponds, glaciers > 1 km^{2} (0.386 sq mi or 247 acres) and river estuaries.

Montmédy (French pronunciation: [mɔ̃.me.di], German: Mittelberg) is a commune in the Meuse department in Grand Est in north-eastern France.

== Citadel of Montmédy ==
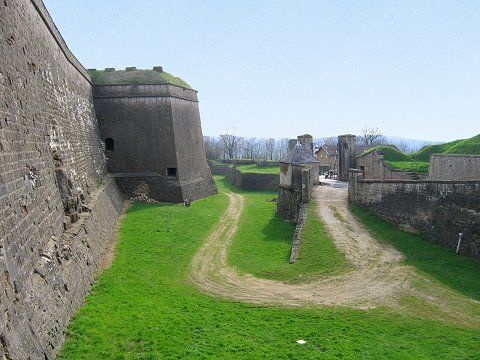
The citadel of Montmédy

In 1221 the first castle of Montmédy was built on top of a hill by the Count of Chiny. Montmédy soon became the capital of his territory – later it belonged to Luxembourg, Burgundy, Austria and Spain. The original castle was replaced with a fortress by Charles V in the 16th century.

After Marville and Stenay had been occupied by the French, 30,000 soldiers, including King Louis XIV, attacked Montmédy, whilst 756 were defending it in 1657. They held it for 57 days and surrendered only after the death of the governor Jean V of Allamont. The military engineer Vauban advanced the outer fortifications, the moats and the walls after the siege of 1657.

During the French Revolution in 1791, the fortress was the anticipated destination of King Louis XVI and his family in their unsuccessful attempt to escape from the growing radical republicanism of Paris. The area at that time was overwhelmingly pro-monarchy. The royal party never arrived, however, because they were discovered en route at Varennes and escorted back to the capital city. The King had hoped to establish a counter-revolutionary military base of operations in the citadel from which he could reclaim the country. The citadel has also been used as a fortress during both World Wars.

Buildings, including a church dating back to the 17th century, can be found inside the citadel itself; it still is used as a place to live. Most of the buildings are derelict or already collapsed; some of them are still in use as tenements. An Office de Tourisme (Tourist Office) can be found in the citadel.

== Geography ==
The river Othain joins the Chiers in the eastern part of the commune. The village lies on the right bank of the Chiers.

== Population ==
Historical population
Year	Pop.	±% p.a.
1968	2,196	—
1975	2,250	+0.35%
1982	2,024	−1.50%
1990	1,943	−0.51%
1999	2,260	+1.69%
2007	2,263	+0.02%
2012	2,311	+0.42%
2017	2,136	−1.56%
2023	2,052	−0.67%
Source: INSEE

== Notable people ==
A museum is devoted to the painter Jules Bastien-Lepage. The eccentric harpist and composer Nicolas-Charles Bochsa (1789–1856) was born in Montmédy, where his father Karl Bochsa was an oboist belonging to the Army. Future President François Mitterrand was stationed as a soldier at Montmédy in 1939, whilst the 19th-century general Jean-Gabriel Thiébault was born there in 1783.

== See also ==
- Siege of Montmédy
- Communes of the Meuse department
