= Mézières-en-Gâtinais =

- Commune
- Coat of arms
- Location of Mézières-en-Gâtinais
- Location within France Location within Centre-Val de Loire
- Coordinates: 48°02′09″N 2°29′27″E
- Country: France
- Region: Centre-Val de Loire
- Department: Loiret
- Arrondissement: Montargis
- Canton: Lorris
- Intercommunality: Canaux et Forêts en Gâtinais

Government
  - Mayor (2020–2026): Alain Thillou
- Area^{1}: 9.86 km^{2} (3.81 sq mi)
- Highest elevation: 111 m (364 ft)
- Lowest elevation: 92 m (302 ft)
- Population (2023): 261
  - Density: 26.5/km^{2} (68.6/sq mi)
- Demonym: Macériens
- Time zone: UTC+01:00 (CET)
  - Summer (DST): UTC+02:00 (CEST)
- INSEE/Postal code: 45205 /45270
- ^{1} French Land Register data, which excludes lakes, ponds, glaciers > 1 km^{2} (0.386 sq mi or 247 acres) and river estuaries.

Mézières-en-Gâtinais (French pronunciation: [mezjɛʁ ɑ̃ ɡɑtinɛ]; literally "Mézières in Gâtinais") is a commune in the Loiret department in north-central France.

== See also ==
- Communes of the Loiret department
- Siege of Mézières (1870–1871)
