= Witty (surname) =

Witty is a surname. Notable people with the name include:

- Andrew Witty (born 1964), English chief executive officer and university chancellor
- Arthur Witty (1878–1969), Spanish footballer, club president and businessman
- Chris Witty (born 1975), American speed skater and racing cyclist
- Ernest Witty (1880–1969), Spanish footballer, tennis player and businessman
- George Witty (1856–1941), New Zealand Member of Parliament for Riccarton
- John Witty (1915–1990), British film and television actor
- Will Witty (born 1995), English rugby union player

== See also ==
- Featherstone-Witty
- Whitty
