= Frederick Guest Tomlins =

English journalist (1804–1867)

Frederick Guest Tomlins (1804–1867) was an English journalist.

== Life ==
He was born in August 1804. He was originally in the employment of Whittaker & Co., publishers, London, as publishing clerk and literary assistant to George Byrom Whittaker. Soon after Whittaker's death in 1847, he went into business as a publisher in Southampton Street, The Strand, London, and there issued a publication called The Self-Educator. He next opened a shop for new and secondhand books in Great Russell Street, Bloomsbury, near the British Museum; but after a while he gave up business for writing.

In 1831 he was a contributor to Henry Hetherington's Poor Man's Guardian, and afterwards to the Weekly Times, in which he published the series of articles signed ‘Littlejohn.’ He was for some time sub-editor of Douglas Jerrold's Weekly Newspaper, and was editorially connected with the Weekly Times and with The Leader.

Tomlins was the founder of the Shakespeare Society in 1840, and acted as the society's secretary. From 1850 to his death he was the dramatic and fine-art critic of the Morning Advertiser. On the death of his uncle, in 1864, he succeeded him as clerk of the Painter-Stainers' Company, an office which had been held by his grandfather. His tragedy, ‘Garcia, or the Noble Error,’ was produced at Sadler's Wells on 12 December 1849. He died at the Painter-Stainers' Hall, Little Trinity Lane, London, on 21 September 1867, and was buried at St. Peter's Church, Croydon, on 27 September.

== Works ==
He was the author of:

- A Universal Gazetteer, Ancient and Modern (1836), 2 vols.
- The Past and Present State of Dramatic Art and Literature (1839).
- A History of England from the Invasion of the Romans (1839), 3 vols.; another edition 1857, 3 vols.
- A Brief View of the English Drama, with suggestions for elevating the present condition of the art (1840).
- The Nature and State of the English Drama (1841).
- The Relative Value of the Acted and Unacted Drama (1841).
- A Complete System of Geography, Ancient and Modern (1845).
- Remarks on the Present State of the English Drama (1851).
