= Ernest Whitty =

English footballer

Personal information
- Date of birth: 7 July 1907
- Place of birth: Warrington, England
- Date of death: 1985 (aged 77–78)
- Position: Winger

Senior career*
Years	Team	Apps	(Gls)
1931–1932	Burnley	2	(0)
–	Darwen	?	(?)
–	Chorley	?	(?)
- * Club domestic league appearances and goals

Ernest Whitty (7 July 1907 – 1985) was an English professional footballer who played as a winger.
