= Edward Michael Whitty =

English journalist (1827–1860)

Edward Michael Whitty (1827–1860) was an English journalist, known for biting parliamentary reporting, and credited for popularising the concept of the "governing classes".

== Life ==
The son of Michael James Whitty, was born in London, and was educated at the Liverpool Institute and in Hanover. About 1844 he became a reporter on the provincial press, and from 1846 to 1849 he was the writer of the parliamentary summary of The Times. He was also the London correspondent of the Liverpool Journal.

For several years Whitty served with George Henry Lewes and E. F. S. Pigott on the staff of The Leader, where his sarcastic style came out in parliamentary sketches. These columns built up with essays, published from 14 August 1852), to the innovative description of the debates by "The Stranger in Parliament" appearing from 13 November that year. In time, however, Whitty quarrelled with his colleagues on The Leader.

Whitty was appointed editor of the Northern Whig early in 1857, but was sacked in the spring of 1858. He returned for a time to London, and on the death of his wife and two children emigrated to Australia to work on the Melbourne Argus. He died at Melbourne, at the house of a relative, on 21 February 1860. A few years later a monument was erected to his memory.

== Works ==
A selection from Whitty's parliamentary sketches was published anonymously in 1854 as the History of the Session 1852–3: a Parliamentary Retrospect. A volume entitled The Derbyites and the Coalition (1854?) is assigned to Whitty by Samuel Austin Allibone. A series of Whitty's Leader articles was collected in The Governing Classes of Great Britain: Political Portraits (London, 1854; with additions, 1859). The volume is said to have greatly impressed Montalembert. The phrase "the governing classes" is earlier found in Thomas Carlyle (Cromwell's Letters and Speeches, 1845, ii. 150), but became identified with Whitty's volume; Robert Barnabas Brough dedicated to him in 1855 his Songs of the Governing Classes.

Whitty dashed off a novel Friends of Bohemia, or Phases of London Life (London, 1857, 2 vols.; New York and Philadelphia, 1864, with memoir). It contained satire and epigrams directed at former colleagues on The Leader.

== Notes ==
Attribution

This article incorporates text from a publication now in the public domain: Lee, Sidney, ed. (1900). "Whitty, Edward Michael". Dictionary of National Biography. Vol. 61. London: Smith, Elder & Co.
