= Villing =

- Commune
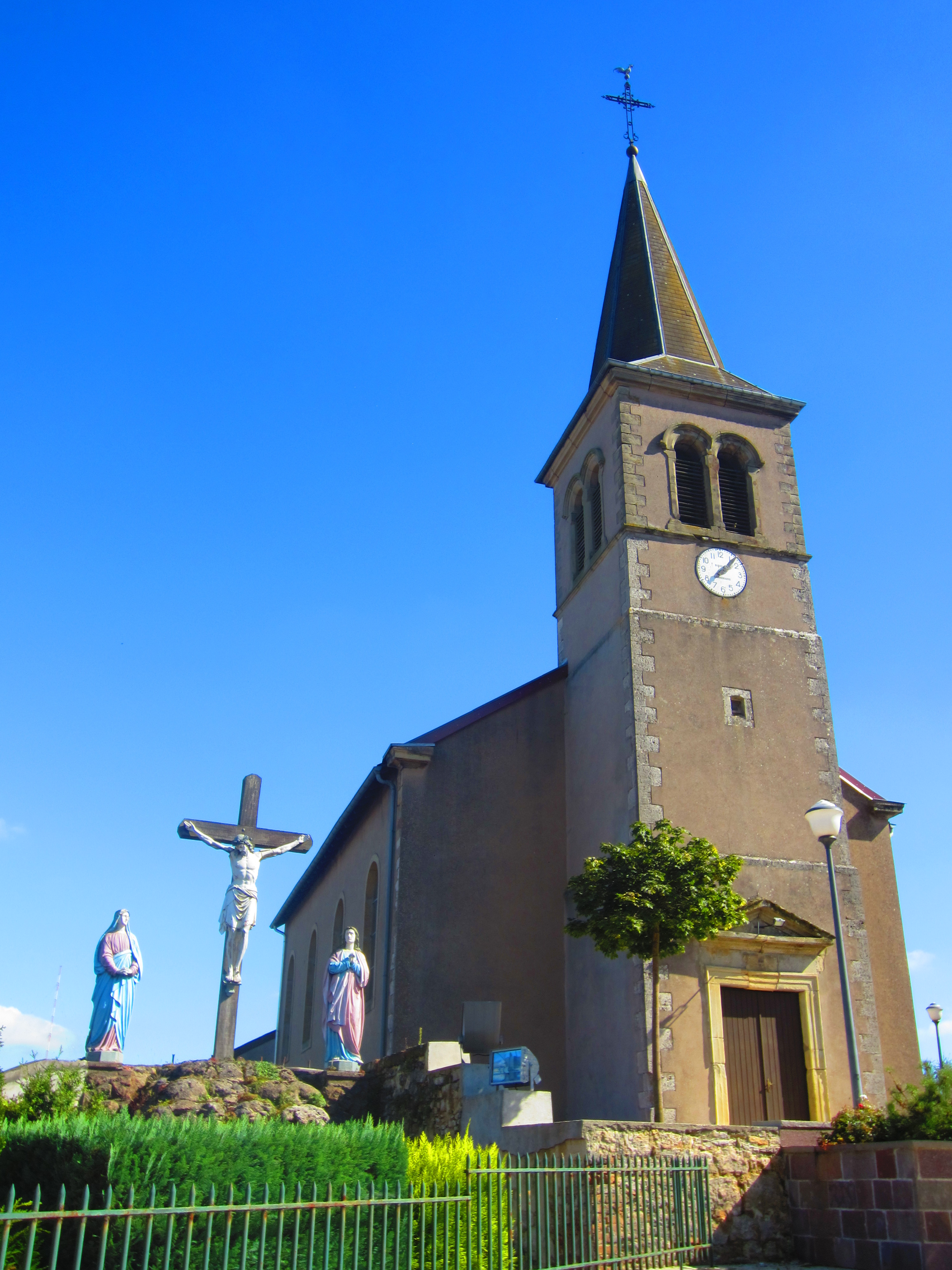
- The church in Villing

- Coat of arms
- Location of Villing
- Location within France Location within Grand Est
- Coordinates: 49°16′55″N 6°37′54″E
- Country: France
- Region: Grand Est
- Department: Moselle
- Arrondissement: Forbach-Boulay-Moselle
- Canton: Bouzonville
- Intercommunality: CC Houve-Pays Boulageois

Government
  - Mayor (2020–2026): Jean-Jacques Schramm
- Area^{1}: 4.93 km^{2} (1.90 sq mi)
- Elevation: 274 m (899 ft)
- Highest elevation: 366 m (1,201 ft)
- Lowest elevation: 240 m (790 ft)
- Population (2023): 511
  - Density: 104/km^{2} (268/sq mi)
- Time zone: UTC+01:00 (CET)
  - Summer (DST): UTC+02:00 (CEST)
- INSEE/Postal code: 57720 /57550
- ^{1} French Land Register data, which excludes lakes, ponds, glaciers > 1 km^{2} (0.386 sq mi or 247 acres) and river estuaries.

Villing (French pronunciation: [vilɛ̃]; German: Willingen) is a commune in the Moselle department in Grand Est in north-eastern France.

Localities of the commune: Trois-Maisons, Gaweistroff, Bedem.

== See also ==
- Communes of the Moselle department
