= Georg von Kameke =

German general (1817–1893)

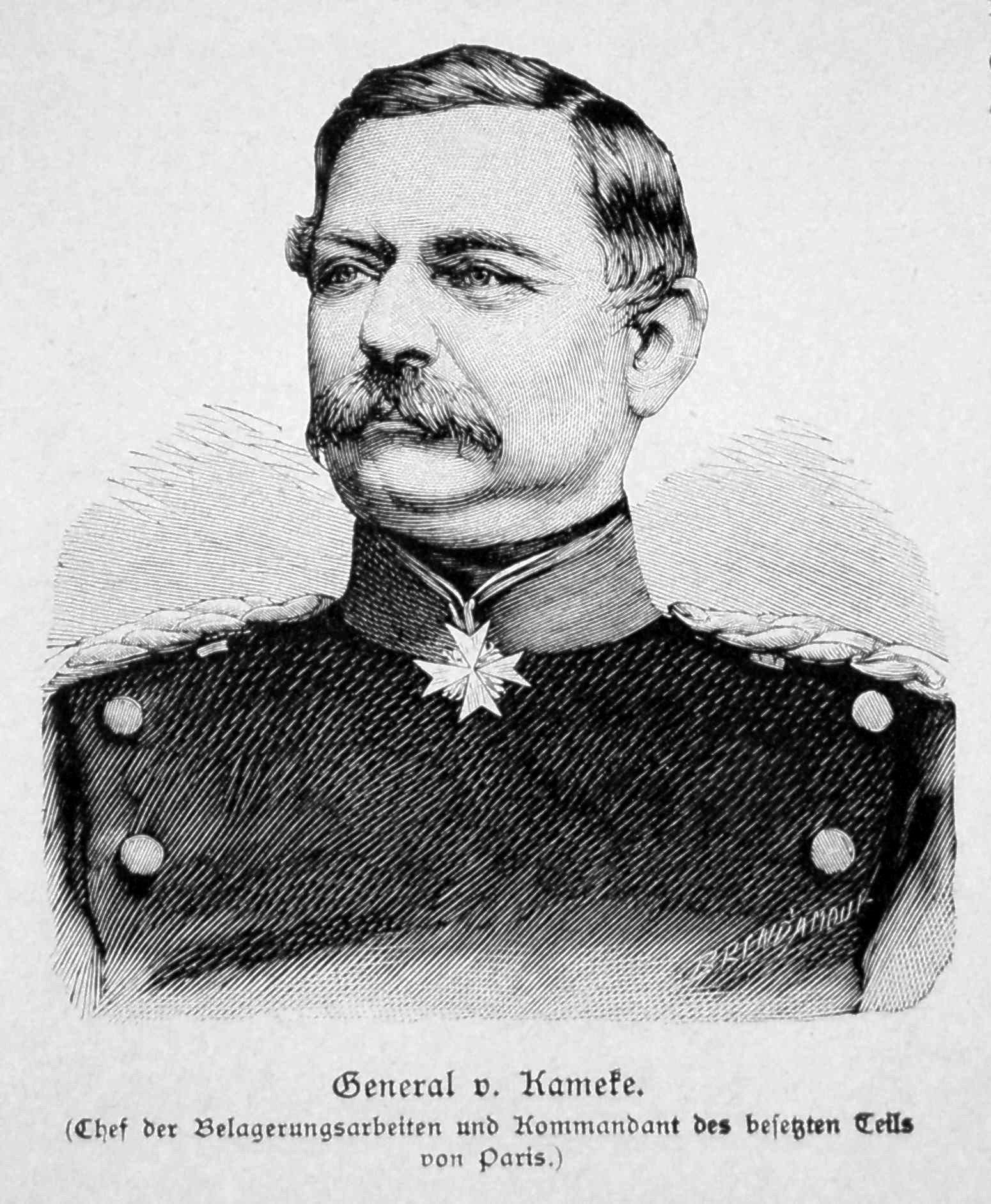

Prussian Minister of War
- In office 9 September 1873 – 3 March 1883
- Monarch: Wilhelm I of Prussia
- Preceded by: Albrecht von Roon
- Succeeded by: Paul Bronsart von Schellendorf

Acting Minister of War
- In office 1 January 1873 – 9 September 1873

Personal details
- Born: 14 April 1817 Pasewalk, Kingdom of Prussia, German Confederation
- Died: 12 October 1893 (aged 76) Berlin, Kingdom of Prussia, German Empire
- Awards: Pour le Mérite with oak leaves Order of the Black Eagle

Military service
- Allegiance: Kingdom of Prussia (1817–1918); German Empire (1871–1893)
- Branch/service: Prussian Army; Imperial German Army
- Years of service: 1834–1883
- Rank: General der Infantrie
- Commands: Chief of Staff, VIII Corps; Chief of Staff, II Corps; 14th Division; Corps of Engineers
- Battles/wars: Austro-Prussian War; Franco-Prussian War

Arnold Karl Georg von Kameke (14 April 1817, in Pasewalk – 12 October 1893, in Berlin) was a Prussian General of the Infantry and Minister of War.

== Life ==
Arnold Karl Georg von Kameke was the son of Prussian army officer Georg Christian Friedrich von Kameke.

Kameke began his military career in the Prussian Army in 1834 by enlisting in the 2nd Engineer Battalion in Stettin. In 1836 he became an officer in the corps of Engineers and 1850 was assigned to the General Staff, after being promoted to captain. In 1861 he was made a colonel and in 1863 chief of staff of the VIII Corps. In 1865 he became a major general and a short while later became chief of staff of the II Corps.

He participated in the Austro-Prussian War as chief of staff of the II Corps, which was part of the First Army. Kameke was awarded the Pour le Mérite for his services in the war. In 1867 he was made head of the entire corps of engineers, and in 1868 he was made a lieutenant general.

In the Franco-Prussian War Kameke commanded the 14th Division and fought in the Battle of Spicheren, the Battle of Borny-Colombey and the Battle of Gravelotte. After the surrender of the fortress of Metz, he conquered Thionville, Montmédy and besieged Mézières. But before Méziéres fell he was called to Versailles on 23 December 1870 to lead the engineers' attack against Paris. For his actions, Kameke received the oak leaves to the Pour le Mérite. From 18 February 1871 onwards he again headed the corps of engineers and also served as Inspector General of Fortresses.

On 9 September 1873, after having acted on the post since the turn of the year, Kameke succeeded Albrecht von Roon as Minister of War. On 22 March 1875, he was appointed General of the Infantry. On 3 March 1883, he retired from his posts and withdrew to his property, Hohenfelde near Kolberg in Pomerania.

== Honours ==
He received the following orders and decorations:

- Prussia:
  - Knight of Honour of the Johanniter Order, 1856; Knight of Justice, 1876
  - Pour le Mérite (military), 20 September 1866; with Oak Leaves, 2 January 1871
  - Iron Cross (1870), 1st Class
  - Knight of the Red Eagle, 2nd Class with Star, Oak Leaves and Swords, 1871; Grand Cross with Swords on Ring, 26 September 1876
  - Knight of the Black Eagle, 25 September 1879; with Collar, 1880
  - Grand Commander's Cross of the Royal House Order of Hohenzollern, with Star, 6 March 1883
  - Service Award Cross
- (Austrian Empire) (Kingdom of Hungary) Austria-Hungary:
  - Knight of the Iron Crown, 1st Class, 1872
  - Grand Cross of the Imperial Order of Leopold, 1880
- Bavaria: Commander of the Military Order of Max Joseph, 1 May 1876
- Belgium: Grand Cordon of the Order of Leopold (military), 7 December 1876
- France: Grand Officer of the Legion of Honour
- Hesse-Kassel: Commander of the Wilhelmsorden, 2nd Class, 19 January 1863
- Japan: Grand Cordon of the Rising Sun
- (Principality of Schaumburg-Lippe) Lippe:
  - Cross of Honour of the House Order of Lippe, 1st Class with Swords
  - Military Merit Medal, with Swords
- Mecklenburg: Grand Cross of the Wendish Crown, with Golden Crown
- Oldenburg: Grand Cross of the Order of Duke Peter Friedrich Ludwig, with Swords, 26 March 1871
- Portugal: Grand Cross of the Royal Military Order of St. Benedict of Aviz
- Russia:
  - Knight of the White Eagle, with Swords
  - Knight of St. Anna, 1st Class with Swords
- Saxe-Weimar-Eisenach: Grand Cross of the White Falcon, 1881
- Saxony:
  - Grand Cross of the Albert Order, 1871
  - Grand Cross of the Order of Merit, 1876
- Sweden-Norway: Grand Cross of St. Olav, with Swords, 1 June 1875
- Württemberg:
  - Grand Cross of the Friedrich Order, with Swords, 1871
  - Grand Cross of the Military Merit Order, 16 November 1874
  - Grand Cross of the Württemberg Crown, 1876

Political offices
Preceded by Albrecht von Roon	Prussian Minister of War; 1873–1883	Succeeded by Paul Bronsart von Schellendorf
