= Edmund Ollier =

English journalist and author

Edmund Ollier (1827–1886) was an English journalist and writer.

== Life ==
The son of Charles Ollier, he knew Charles Lamb, Mary Lamb, Leigh Hunt and Benjamin Haydon as a child. He was privately educated and began to write. After some years he was a journalist working for The Athenæum, The Daily News, Household Words, and All the Year Round.

Ollier died at his house in Oakley Street, Chelsea, London on 19 April 1886.

== Works ==
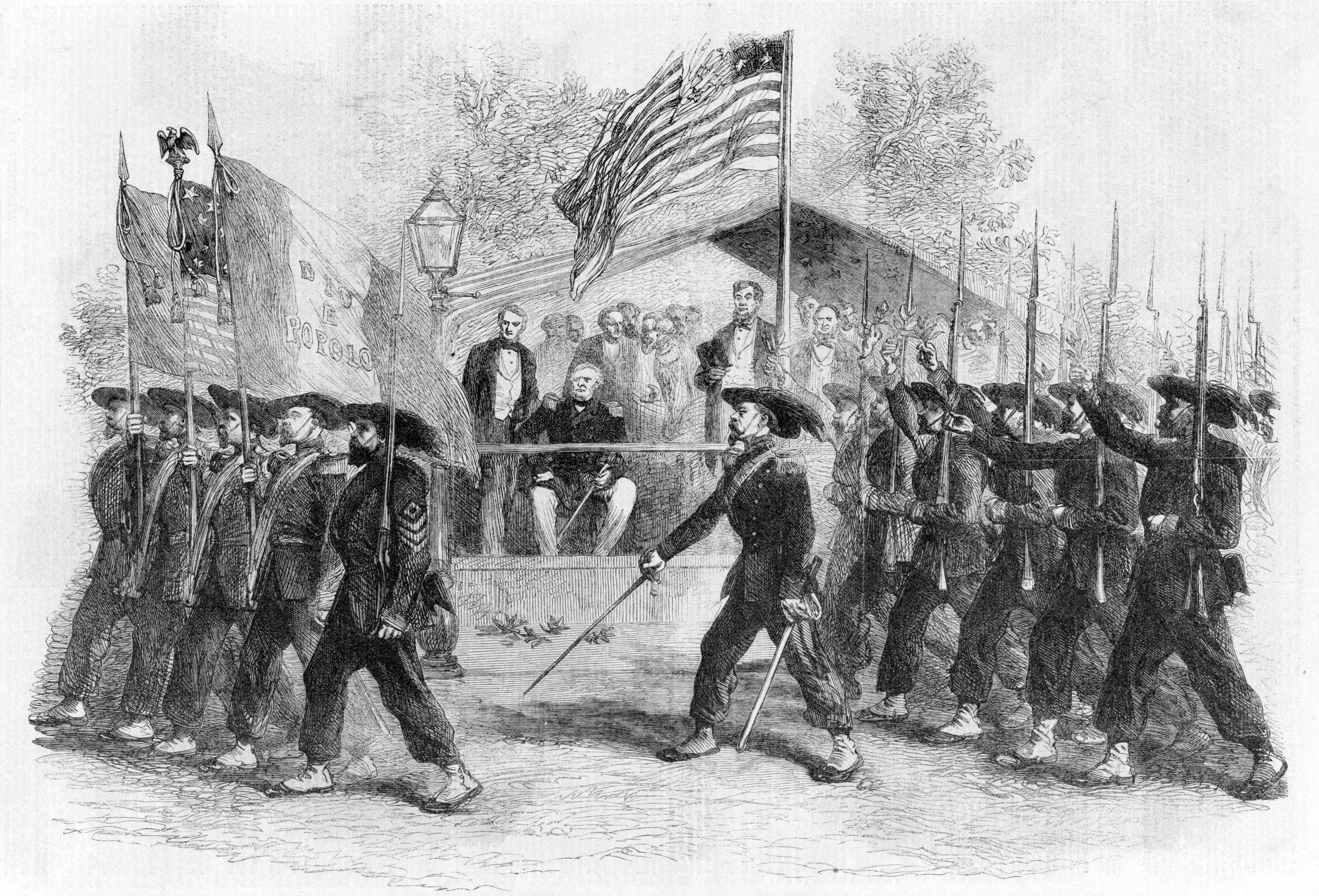
March past of the "Garibaldi Guard" before President Lincoln, illustration from Cassell's Illustrated History of the United States by Edmund Ollier

In 1867 Ollier republished verses which had originally appeared in periodicals as Poems from the Greek Mythology, and Miscellaneous Poems. In the same year he contributed an edition of the first series of the Essays of Elia, with a memoir of the author Charles Lamb, to Hotten's Worldwide Library; and in 1869 published an edition of Leigh Hunt's Tale for the Chimney Corner.

For the publishing firm of Cassell, Petter, & Galpin, Ollier wrote:

- a memoir of Gustave Doré for the Doré Gallery, 2 vols. 1870;
- Cassell's Illustrated History of the War between France and Germany, 2 vols. 1871–2;
- Our British Portrait-Painters from Sir Peter Lely to J. Sant, 1874;
- Cassell's Illustrated History of the United States, 3 vols. 1874–7;
- Cassell's Illustrated History of the Russo-Turkish War, 2 vols. 1877–1879;
- A Popular History of Sacred Art, 1882;
- Cassell's Illustrated Universal History, 4 vols. 1882–5.

At the time of his death he was working on the Life and Times of Queen Victoria. The first eleven chapters were by Ollier, and the remainder of the work by Robert Wilson.

== Family ==
Ollier married a Miss Gattie, who survived him, but left no issue.
