= 14th Division (German Empire) =

14th Division (14. Division); in 1870-71 and from August 2, 1914, 14th Infantry Division (14. Infanterie-Division)
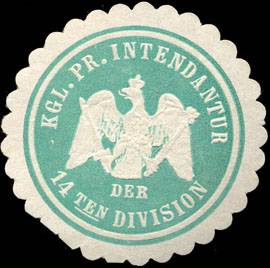
- Seal stamp of the Royal Prussian Intendant of the 14th Division
- Active: 1818–1919
- Country: Prussia/Germany
- Branch: Army
- Type: Infantry (in peacetime included cavalry)
- Size: Approx. 15,000
- Part of: VII. Army Corps (VII. Armeekorps)
- Garrison/HQ: Düsseldorf
- Engagements: Austro-Prussian War: Königgrätz Franco-Prussian War: Spicheren, Colombey, Gravelotte, Metz World War I: Battle of Liège, Great Retreat, 1st Marne, Verdun, German spring offensive, 3rd Aisne

Commanders
- Notable commanders: Karl Anton, Prince of Hohenzollern, Albrecht Graf von Roon, Leonhard Graf von Blumenthal, Georg von Kameke

The 14th Division (14. Division) was a unit of the Prussian/German Army. It was formed in November 1816 in Trier as a troop brigade and became the 14th Division on September 5, 1818, also relocating its headquarters to Düsseldorf. The division was subordinated in peacetime to the VII Army Corps (VII. Armeekorps). The division was disbanded in 1919 during the demobilization of the German Army after World War I. The division was recruited in the Prussian Province of Westphalia and the Rhine Province, primarily in the densely populated Lower Rhine region.

== Combat chronicle ==
The 14th Division fought in the Austro-Prussian War in 1866, seeing action in the Battle of Königgrätz. In the Franco-Prussian War of 1870–71, the division fought in several battles and engagements, including the Battle of Spicheren, the Battle of Borny-Colombey (also called the Battle of Colombey-Nouilly), and the Battle of Gravelotte (also called the Battle of Gravelotte-St. Privat), as well as the Siege of Metz.

During World War I, the division served on the Western Front. It participated in the initial German drive through Belgium and France, including the Battle of Liège and culminating in the First Battle of the Marne. After a period of trench warfare in various parts of the line, the division went to Verdun in 1916. During the 1918 German spring offensive, the division fought in the Third Battle of the Aisne. Allied intelligence rated it a second class division, noted for tenacity on the defense.

== Order of battle in the Franco-Prussian War ==
During wartime, the 14th Division, like other regular German divisions, was redesignated an infantry division. The organization of the 14th Infantry Division in 1870 at the beginning of the Franco-Prussian War was as follows:

- 27. Infanterie Brigade
  - Füsilier-Regiment Nr. 39
  - Infanterie-Regiment Nr. 74
- 28. Infanterie Brigade
  - Infanterie-Regiment Nr. 53
  - Infanterie-Regiment Nr. 77
- Husaren-Regiment Nr. 15

== Pre-World War I organization ==
German divisions underwent various organizational changes after the Franco-Prussian War. The organization of the 14th Division in 1914, shortly before the outbreak of World War I, was as follows:

- 27. Infanterie Brigade
  - Infanterie-Regiment Freiherr von Sparr (3. Westfälisches) Nr. 16
  - 5. Westfälisches Infanterie-Regiment Nr. 53
- 28. Infanterie Brigade
  - Niederrheinisches Füsilier-Regiment Nr. 39
  - 8. Lothringisches Infanterie-Regiment Nr. 159
- 79. Infanterie-Brigade
  - Infanterie-Regiment Vogel von Falckenstein (7. Westfälisches) Nr. 56
  - Infanterie-Regiment Herzog Ferdinand von Braunschweig (8. Westfälisches) Nr. 57
- 14. Kavallerie-Brigade
  - 2. Westfälisches Husaren-Regiment Nr. 11
  - Westfälisches Ulanen-Regiment Nr. 5
- 14. Feldartillerie-Brigade
  - 1. Westfälisches Feldartillerie-Regiment Nr. 7
  - Clevesches Feldartillerie-Regiment Nr. 43
- Landwehr-Inspektion Düsseldorf

== Order of battle on mobilization ==
On mobilization in August 1914 at the beginning of World War I, most divisional cavalry, including brigade headquarters, was withdrawn to form cavalry divisions or split up among divisions as reconnaissance units. Divisions received engineer companies and other support units from their higher headquarters. The 14th Division was again renamed the 14th Infantry Division and sent its 28th Infantry Brigade to the 14th Reserve Division. Its initial wartime organization was as follows:

- 27. Infanterie-Brigade:
  - Infanterie-Regiment Freiherr von Sparr (3. Westfälisches) Nr. 16
  - 5. Westfälisches Infanterie-Regiment Nr. 53
- 79. Infanterie-Brigade:
  - Infanterie-Regiment Vogel von Falckenstein (7. Westfälisches) Nr. 56
  - Infanterie-Regiment Herzog Ferdinand von Braunschweig (8. Westfälisches) Nr. 57
- 3.Eskadron/Ulanen-Regiment Hennigs von Treffenfeld (Altmärkisches) Nr. 16
- 14. Feldartillerie-Brigade:
  - 1. Westfälisches Feldartillerie-Regiment Nr. 7
  - Klevesches Feldartillerie-Regiment Nr. 43
- 2. Kompanie/Westfälisches Pionier-Bataillon Nr. 7
- 3. Kompanie/Westfälisches Pionier-Bataillon Nr. 7

== Late World War I organization ==
Divisions underwent many changes during the war, with regiments moving from division to division, and some being destroyed and rebuilt. During the war, most divisions became triangular - one infantry brigade with three infantry regiments rather than two infantry brigades of two regiments (a "square division"). An artillery commander replaced the artillery brigade headquarters, the cavalry was further reduced, the engineer contingent was increased, and a divisional signals command was created. The 14th Infantry Division's order of battle on February 19, 1918, was as follows:

- 79. Infanterie-Brigade:
  - Infanterie-Regiment Freiherr von Sparr (3. Westfälisches) Nr. 16
  - Infanterie-Regiment Vogel von Falkenstein (7. Westfälisches) Nr. 56
  - Infanterie-Regiment Herzog Ferdinand von Braunschweig (8. Westfälisches) Nr. 57
  - Maschinengewehr-Scharfschützen-Abteilung Nr. 23
- 5.Eskadron/Ulanen-Regiment Hennigs von Treffenfeld (Altmärkisches) Nr. 16
- Artillerie-Kommandeur 14:
  - Klevesches Feldartillerie-Regiment Nr. 43
  - I. Bataillon/Fußartillerie-Regiment Nr. 21 (from 09.04.1918)
- Pionier-Bataillon Nr. 124
  - 3./Westfälisches Pionier-Bataillon Nr. 7
  - 5./Westfälisches Pionier-Bataillon Nr. 7
  - Minenwerfer-Kompanie Nr. 14
- Divisions-Nachrichten-Kommandeur 14
