= Garde Mobile =

French military reserve corps, manned by wealthy men who paid to avoid draft

The Garde mobile ("Mobile Guard"; also called Garde nationale mobile though it had nothing to do with the Garde nationale) was intended to be a reserve force of all able-bodied men previously not drafted (such as single men and childless widowers), trained yearly, during the time of Napoleon III.

Length of service was intended to be five years, with a draft of 116,000 men per year. Napoleon III took up the idea and announced on 12 December 1866 that the Garde Mobile would eventually attain a strength of 400,000 troops, thus reaching the ruler's target of one million French troops. Adolphe Niel, Minister of War for France under Emperor Napoleon III, was in charge of implementing the plan.

Both the left and the right in the Corps Legislatif took issue with the proposal. Traditionalists wanted an all-professional army; liberals were opposed to Bonapartist militarism. But the law to create the Garde was passed in diluted form in January 1868 by 199 to 60 votes and came into force on February 1st of that year. Given the dilution, the Garde Mobile was not fully implemented as planned. It numbered some 90,000 men in 1870 and trained only 14 days per year, non-consecutively, instead of the intended 20 days consecutively. In some cases, the amount of training was even less: in 1869, one battalion trained only for seven days, the sessions lasting three hours each. Additionally, conscripts with any prior knowledge of drill and military education were excused altogether from training. The discipline and equipment of the Garde were regarded as quite bad, especially when compared to the regular army.

After Niel's death in 1869, his replacement Edmond Le Bœuf regarded the Garde with disdain.

The Garde Mobile was called up on in July 1870, as part of the Franco-Prussian War, but arrived too late to Eastern France to be useful, presuming they could have been of use at all, considering how badly many senior officers considered their temperament and outfit.

== Representation in Art ==
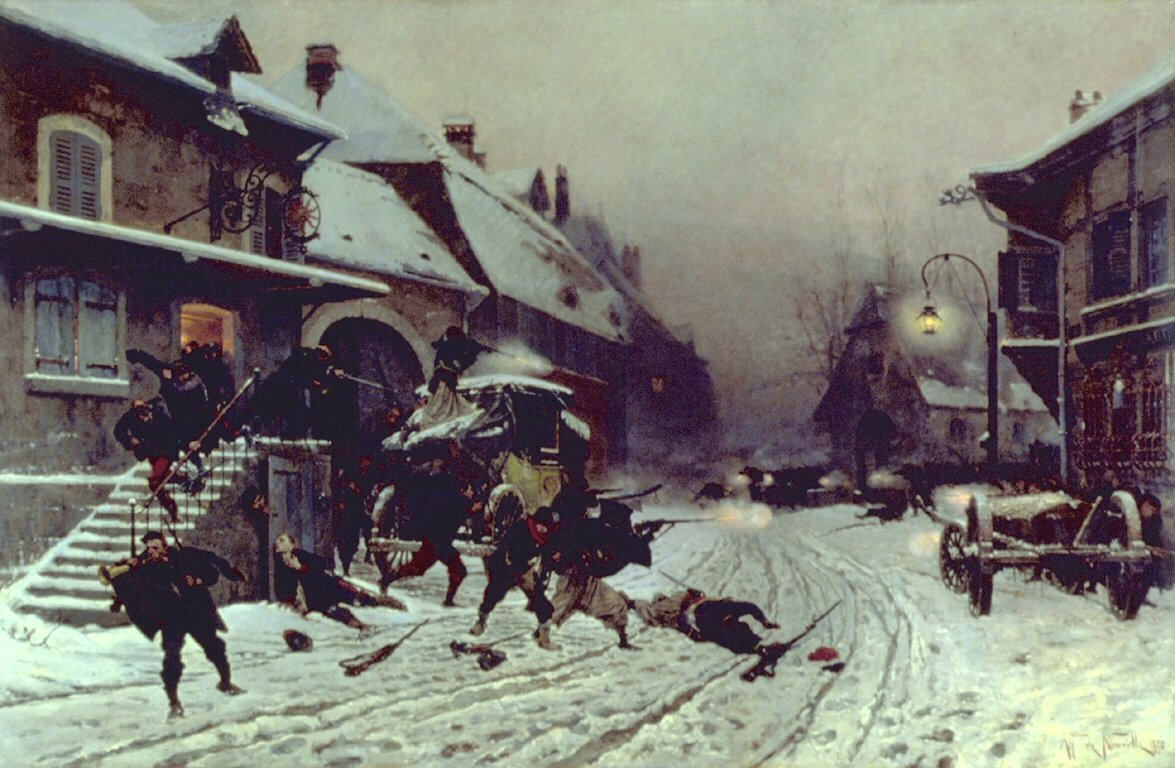
The Attack at Dawn (Alphonse de Neuville, 1877). Prussian troops advance on a French town; French troops including Algerian riflemen and members of the Garde Mobile rush to defend. The Walters Art Museum.
