= Hardy Brothers Building =

Heritage-listed building in Brisbane, Queensland

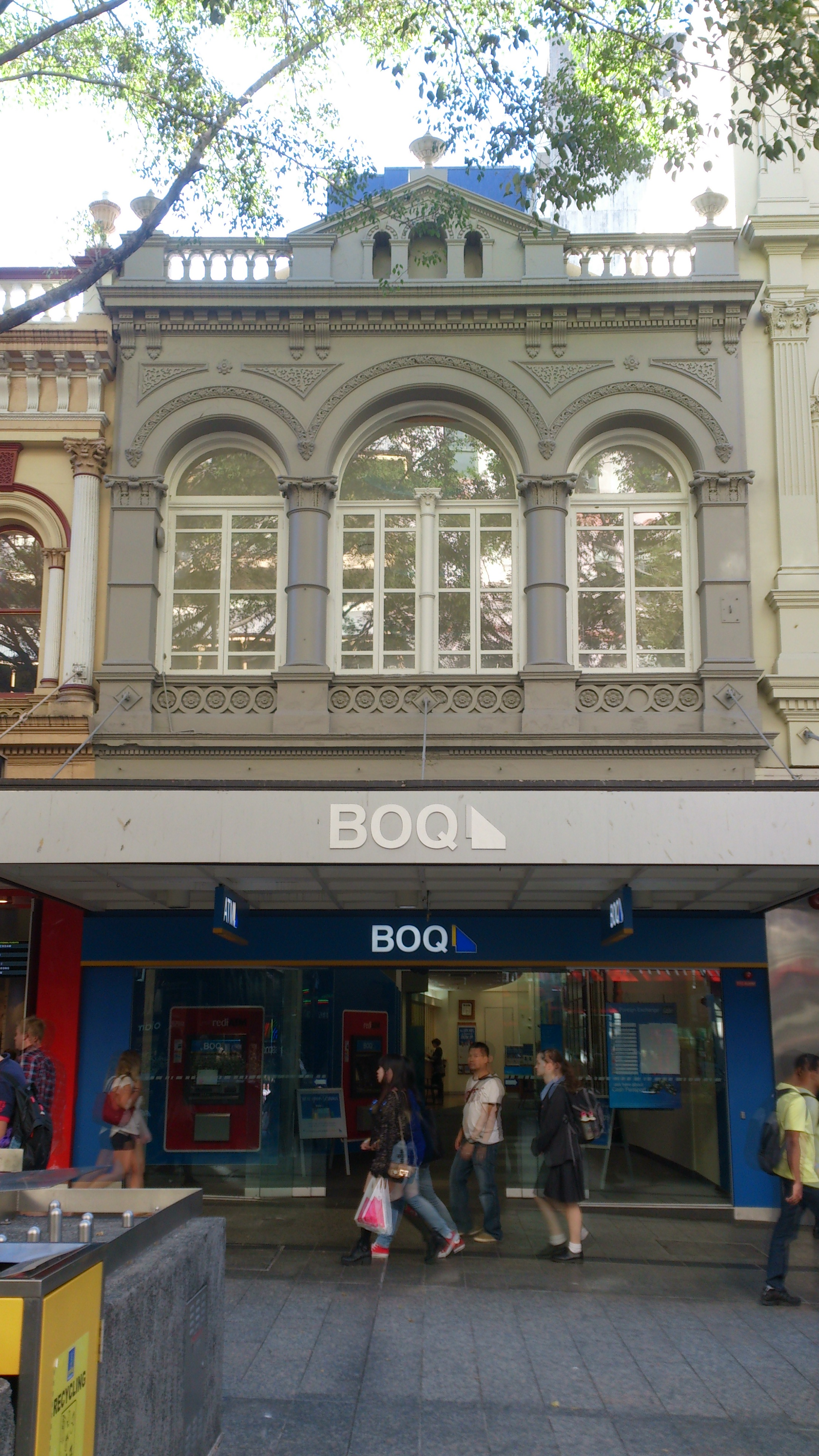
- Hardy Brothers Building, 2014

- Location within Queensland
- 27.4697°S 153.0246°E
- Location: 116 Queen Street, Brisbane City, City of Brisbane, Queensland, Australia

History
- Design period: 1870s–1890s (late 19th century)
- Built: 1881

Site notes
- Architect: Richard Gailey
- Architectural style: Italianate

Queensland Heritage Register
- Official name: Hardy Brothers, Love's Auction Mart
- Type: state heritage (built)
- Designated: 21 October 1992
- Reference no.: 600138
- Significant period: 1881 (fabric) c. 1895–1979 (historical)

Hardy Brothers Building is a heritage-listed shop at 116 Queen Street, Brisbane City, City of Brisbane, Queensland, Australia. It was designed by Richard Gailey and built in 1881. It is also known as Love's Auction Mart. It was added to the Queensland Heritage Register on 21 October 1992.

== History ==
This building was constructed in 1881 principally for Love's Auction Mart, on land owned by Brisbane architect Richard Gailey.

A government decision to demolish the convict barracks which covered this site since 1827 and to dispose of the Crown land, gave impetus to the redevelopment of that portion of the northern side of Queen Street bounded by the old Brisbane Town Hall (in 2016, the NEXT hotel site) and Albert Street. A deed of grant for allotment 12 of section 12 was issued to Richard Gailey, architect, in April 1881. By June work had commenced on the erection of a two-storeyed brick building with stone foundations. With a 24-foot (7.3 m) frontage to Queen Street and a depth of 138 feet (42 m), the lower floor of the building was to serve as an auction mart for David Love, auctioneer and valuator. Richard Gailey occupied some office space on the upper floor. Given his ownership of the land and occupancy of the office, it is most probable that Gailey was responsible for the design of the building.

In 1888 importing ironmongers Wilson and Southerden moved to this site. Before moving in they made improvements to the premises, rebuilding part of the facade by erecting an archway on the ground level, described as the finest in the city. Gailey transferred title to his mortgagor Australian Mutual Provident Society in July 1894.

AMP issued a 3 year lease to John, Samuel and Arthur Morley Hardy. The Hardy brothers initially leased only the ground and basement floors, and purchased the site in October 1895. Photographic suppliers Baker and Rouse shared the ground floor during the late 1890s, and WT Atthow solicitor occupied rooms on the first floor.

Various tenants occupied the upper floor in the intervening years until 1963 when Gardams Trading Pty Ltd took over the lease. An opening from the adjacent Gardams Building was made in the wall, allowing movement between premises.

In 1979 title for this property passed from Hardy Brothers, though the company occupying it continues to trade under that name. Hardy Brothers have subsequently relocated to new premises at 225 Queen Street. In 2016, the building is occupied by the Bank of Queensland.

== Description ==
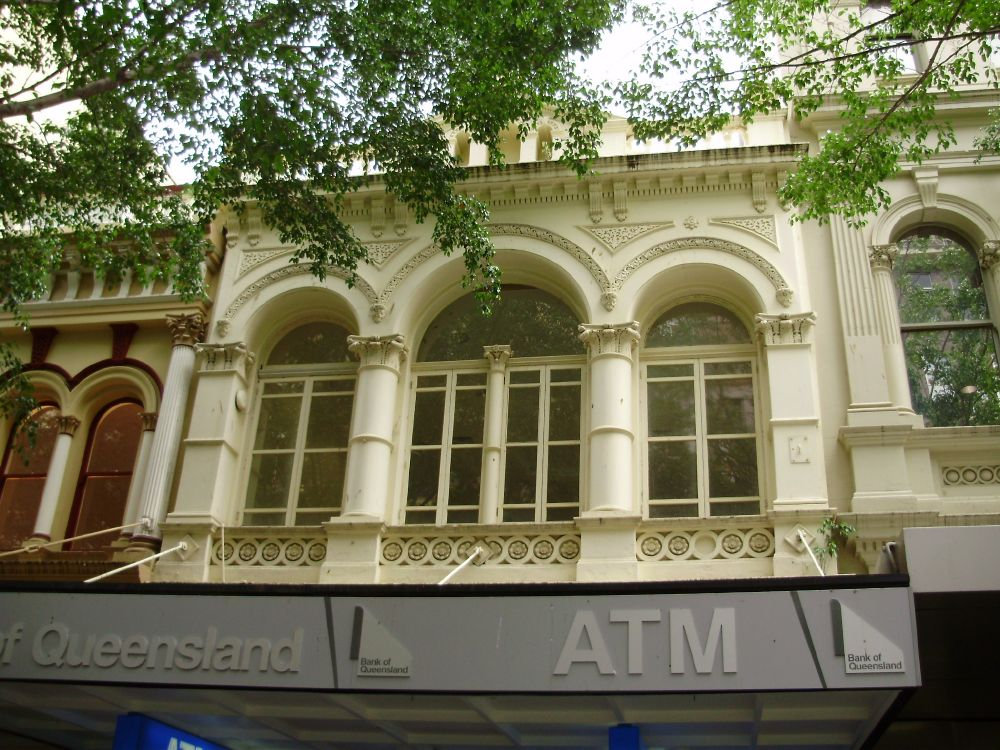
Upper level, Hardy Brothers Building, 2009

Hardy Brothers is a Victorian era Italianate building located at 116 Queen Street. It consists of two storeys and a basement and is built predominantly of stuccoed brick on a stone foundation.

The lower level Queen Street facade has undergone numerous changes while the upper level is mostly intact. This consists of three semicircular arched window openings, the central arch being larger than the ones to either side. This central arch originally had two smaller archways supported on a slender central Corinthian column above which was a small circular window. The original sash windows of these openings have been replaced by large casements. The three openings are separated by pilasters with Corinthian capitals. Below each window is a balustrade of roundels, with a rosette in each circle. Above the arches is a continuous decorative label mould of floral motifs, with floral label stops. The cornice is made prominent by a row of dentils, and four sets of elaborate paired brackets. Above the cornice is an ornate parapet with a central triangular pediment containing three arched recesses echoing the window openings below. The rest of the parapet has a balustrade of small arched balusters, and at each end of the parapet is a pedestal supporting a vase. A vase also stands at the peak of the central pediment.

The lower facade originally had three arched openings, but by the 1890s a steel and glass shopfront had been installed. The shopfront has been considerably altered over time to suit different tenants. One such shopfront was designed by Lange Powell in 1914. The street level facade now has a recessed doorway, plate glass window and a modern cantilevered awning.

Internally the building is connected at the first floor level to its neighbour Gardams Building. At the basement level there is visible evidence of the original stone construction, brick partitioning walls and timber structure to the floor above.

The building is part of a group of intact Victorian era buildings in this part of Queen Street and thus has a significant influence on the streetscape.

== Heritage listing ==
Hardy Brothers was listed on the Queensland Heritage Register on 21 October 1992 having satisfied the following criteria.

The place is important in demonstrating the evolution or pattern of Queensland's history.

Hardy Brothers building survives as an important example of the secondary phase of development in Queen Street during the early 1880s, initiated by the disposal of the convict barracks.

The place is important in demonstrating the principal characteristics of a particular class of cultural places.

The place is important in demonstrating the principal characteristics of a late 19th century commercial building with ornate Italianate detailing, and aesthetically makes a strong contribution to the streetscape of Queen Street as part of a group of surviving 1880s commercial buildings.

The place is important because of its aesthetic significance.

The place is important in demonstrating the principal characteristics of a late 19th century commercial building with ornate Italianate detailing, and aesthetically makes a strong contribution to the streetscape of Queen Street as part of a group of surviving 1880s commercial buildings.

The place has a special association with the life or work of a particular person, group or organisation of importance in Queensland's history.

The place has a strong and special long term association with the firm of Hardy Brothers, and a special association with owner and occupier Brisbane architect Richard Gailey.
