= Palings Building =

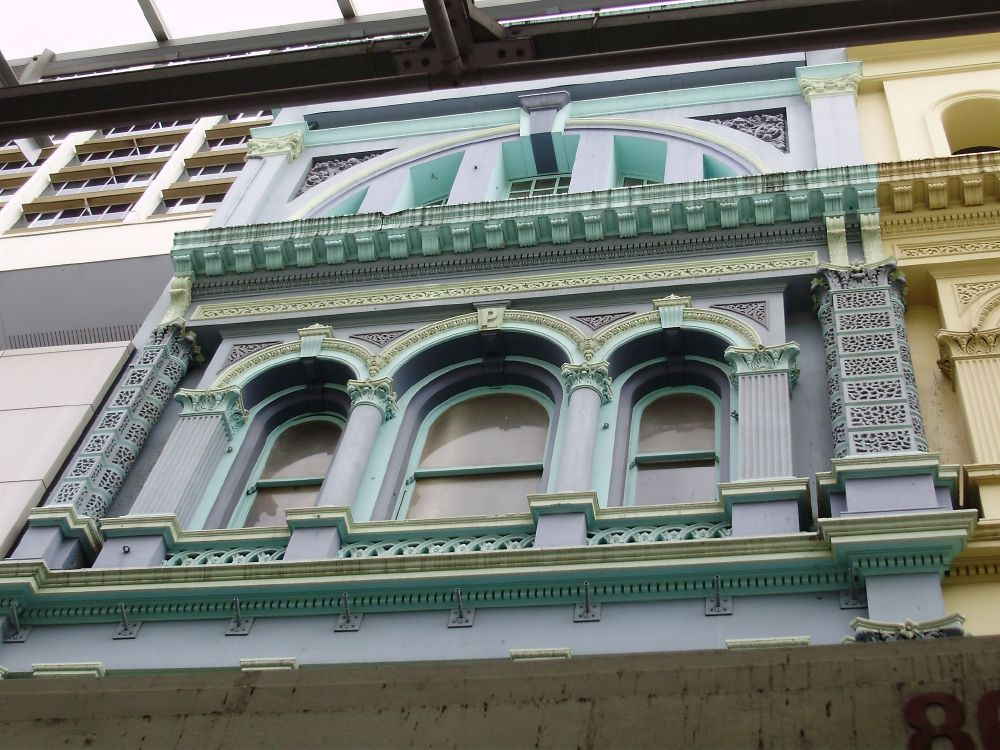
- Upper facade of the former Palings building, 2009

- Location within Queensland
- 27.4701°S 153.0242°E
- Location: 86 Queen Street, Brisbane City, City of Brisbane, Queensland, Australia

History
- Design period: 1870s–1890s (late 19th century)
- Built: 1885–1919

Site notes
- Architect: Richard Gailey
- Architectural style: Italianate

Queensland Heritage Register
- Official name: City International Duty Free, Palings Building
- Type: state heritage (built)
- Designated: 21 October 1992
- Reference no.: 600161
- Significant period: 1885–1919 (fabric); 1888–1986 (historical – Palings)
- Significant components: elevator
- Builders: Patten & Son

The Palings Building is a heritage-listed retail building located at 86 Queen Street, Brisbane City, City of Brisbane, Queensland, Australia. It was designed by Richard Gailey as one of a row of four identical buildings and built from 1885 to 1919 by Patten & Son. Two of the four buildings have since been demolished while a third survives but is incorporated into another building. The Palings building was added to the Queensland Heritage Register on 21 October 1992; at that time, the building was used for the City International Duty Free store.

== History ==
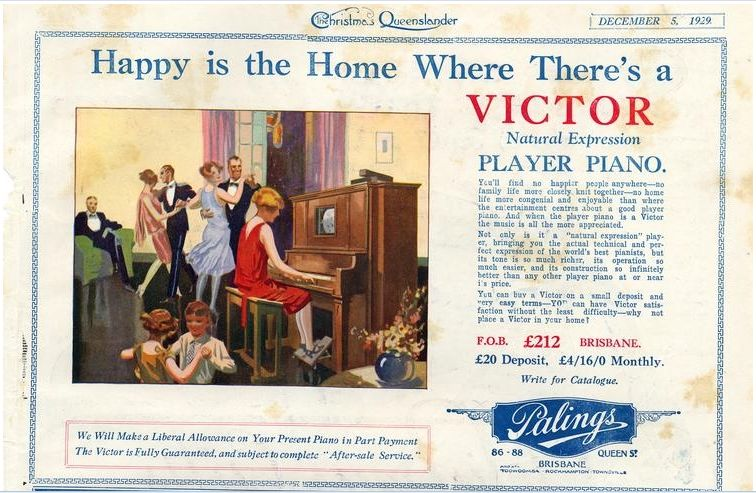
Title: Illustrated advertisement from the supplement to The Christmas Queenslander, 5 December 1929

Palings Building was one of a set of four office buildings erected in 1885, adjacent to the old Brisbane Town Hall in Queen Street. They were constructed for Dr Power, WH Paling and Co. of Sydney, and JS Manwaring, at a cost of £13,000.

Paling & Company purchased the building in 1886 but did not occupy it until 1888. However, once in occupation, Paling's operated a retail store for sheet music and musical instruments from 1888 to 1986 in the building.

Building contractors Patten and Son had commenced construction by July 1885. Of brick with stone foundations, each building comprised three floors and a basement. Established Brisbane architect Richard Gailey designed the four identical premises with a common Queen Street frontage. William Henry Paling gained title to the site in 1886, but Paling & Co did not occupy the building until 1888. Dutch-born Paling had emigrated to Australia in 1853, and had established himself in Sydney in the 1850s as a tutor of piano and violin, composer, concert performer, the inaugurator of several music societies, and a music warehouseman, retailing musical instruments and sheet music. In the 1870s and 1880s, Paling was active in local government and philanthropic work, and died at his Sydney home in 1895.

In 1884, Paling had opened a branch of his business in Toowoomba before establishing the Queen Street store a few years later. Although there were a number of other music and musical instrument sellers in Brisbane in 1888, Paling & Co.'s store flourished, and for nearly a century they were the leaders in the sales of records, sheet music and pianos in Queensland. In the late 19th and early 20th centuries, Paling's piano tuners travelled throughout Brisbane and the Darling Downs, and recitals (until 1930) and tutoring (until the early 1940s) were offered at the Queen Street store. A third Queensland store was opened in Townsville in 1923. In the 1920s, the firm "diversified", with the sale of radios and phonographs. From c. 1914 to 1974, Paling's Queen Street store also offered Brisbane's leading theatre booking service.

An additional storey with an elaborate facade surmounted by an equally ornate pediment was erected on the Paling's Queen Street building prior to 1911. The upper pediment has since been removed. Further unspecified additions were carried out during 1918–19 by builder Blair Cunningham under the guidance of architects Chambers and Powell. The site was occupied by Palings until 1986.

Due to the development of shade structures in the Queen Street Mall, it is difficult for pedestrians to see the facade of the Palings Building.

== Description ==
The Palings building located in central Queen Street is one of four original adjoining bays, only two of which remain. The other adjacent bay is the old Manwaring building which was incorporated into the Allan and Stark Building which also occupied the site of the two demolished bays with a new building.

The majority of both bays date from the Victorian period and are decorated in an Italianate style. The Palings bay consists of four storeys and a basement, the fourth storey being an addition dating from before 1918. This differs from the upper level in the neighbouring bay whereas the original building below is identical in form across both bays.

The bays of the original building are separated by keyed rusticated pilasters and individually are quite narrow in proportion. Both remaining bays extend through to Burnett Lane at the rear. Each bay is symmetrical with the first floor level having rectangular openings and the level above, the top level of the original building, having arched openings with ornamental keystones. The additional full level of Palings has a large archway broken into narrow vertical openings. To each side of this in the corner are ornamental panels with floral mouldings. The upper parapet has the name "PALINGS" in raised lettering. Another partial level is situated above this at the rear of the building and contained toilet facilities. This level is not evident from the Queen Street facade. The rear of the building has plain square openings and is finished in rendered concrete.

Internally the building is very intact, and the shopfittings of the ground floor level would seem easily reversible. Notably the finely detailed plaster ceilings, and the timber passenger lift have survived.

This building along with the adjacent surviving bay make a major contribution to the streetscape in this portion of Queen Street both in their scale and the vertical rhythm of their facades.

== Heritage listing ==
The Palings Building was listed on the Queensland Heritage Register on 21 October 1992 having satisfied the following criteria.

The place is important in demonstrating the evolution or pattern of Queensland's history.

The building demonstrates a rare aspect of Queensland's cultural heritage, being one of a surviving pair of Richard Gailey designed retail buildings in Queen Street, which originally were part of a group of four.

The building is important in demonstrating a range of aesthetic characteristics valued by the community, in particular the intactness of the interior, including the detailed plaster ceilings and the timber-panelled lift and its contribution to the streetscape of Queen Street as part of a group of intact 1880s commercial buildings.

The building has a special association with the firm of WH Paling & Co. Ltd, music and musical instrument retailers, and their contribution to Queensland musical and other cultural pursuits for nearly a century.

The place demonstrates rare, uncommon or endangered aspects of Queensland's cultural heritage.

The building demonstrates a rare aspect of Queensland's cultural heritage, being one of a surviving pair of Richard Gailey designed retail buildings in Queen Street, which originally were part of a group of four.

The place is important because of its aesthetic significance.

The building is important in demonstrating a range of aesthetic characteristics valued by the community, in particular the intactness of the interior, including the detailed plaster ceilings and the timber-panelled lift and its contribution to the streetscape of Queen Street as part of a group of intact 1880s commercial buildings.

The place has a special association with the life or work of a particular person, group or organisation of importance in Queensland's history.

The building has a special association with the firm of WH Paling & Co. Ltd, music and musical instrument retailers, and their contribution to Queensland musical and other cultural pursuits for nearly a century.
