= Crown of Tonga =

Crown of the King of Tonga

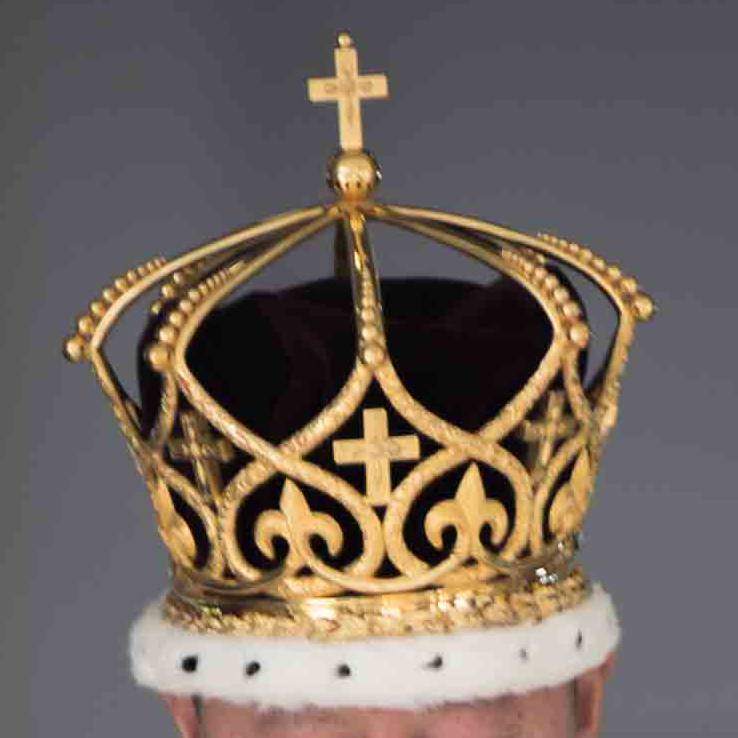

Heraldic depictions

Details
- Country: Tonga
- Made: 1873
- Arches: 8
- Material: Gold
- Cap: Red velvet and ermine
- Notable stones: None

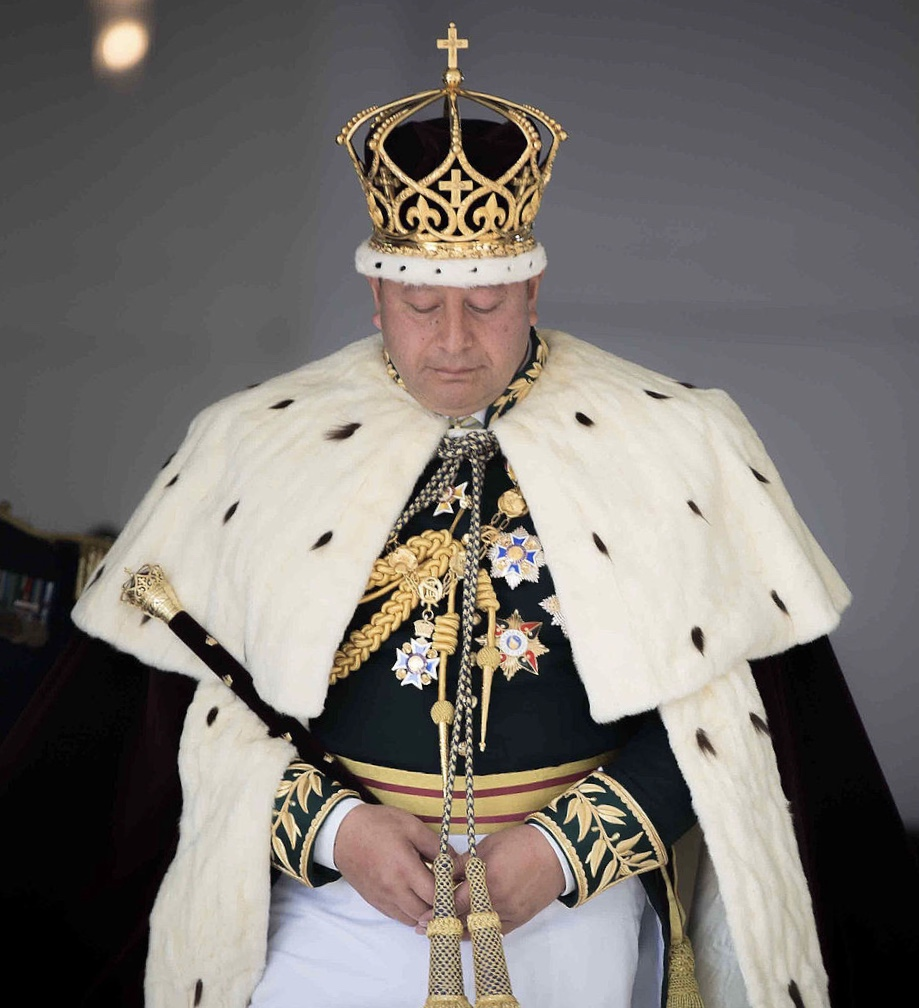
King Tupou VI wearing the Crown of Tonga following his coronation in 2015.

The Crown of Tonga was made in 1873 for George Tupou I at the behest of his prime minister, The Reverend Shirley Waldemar Baker. The crown was fashioned by Hardy Brothers, an Australian jewellery firm. The gold crown of Tonga is reputedly the largest and heaviest crown in the world.

== History ==
For some time, Tonga's independence had been threatened by France. Since 1872 the German Empire also posed a threat to Tonga's independence with threats of annexation. The King and Reverend Baker composed the Constitution of 1875, which is still in effect today. At this time, Tonga also adopted a national flag, a coat-of-arms and a national anthem.

The first king to be crowned with the historic crown was King George Tupou I, the great-grandson and successor Tupou. Tupou II was crowned on 17 March 1893. His daughter and successor Queen Sālote Tupou III was crowned on 11 October 1918. Queen Sālote was succeeded by her eldest son, who became King Tāufa'āhau Tupou IV. He was crowned on his 49th birthday, 4 July 1967. King Tāufa'āhau was succeeded by his eldest son, who became King George Tupou V. He was crowned on 1 August 2008. His younger brother and successor King Tupou VI was crowned on 4 July 2015.
