= Colonial Mutual Chambers =

Heritage-listed building in Brisbane, Queensland

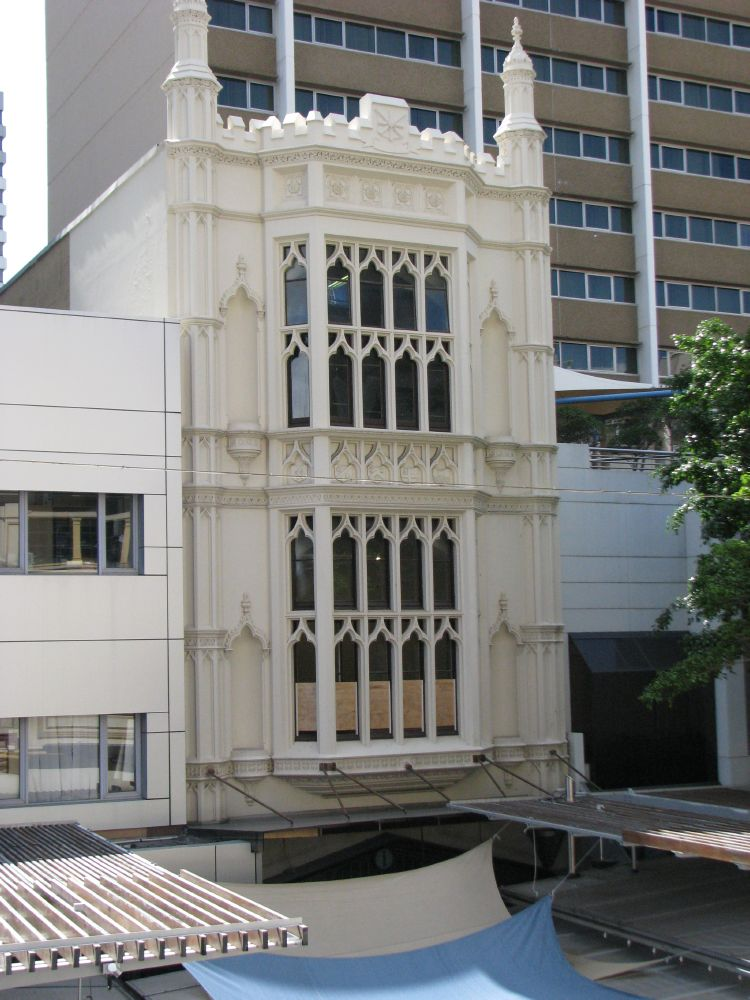
- Former Colonial Mutual Chambers (upper facade), 2008

- Location within Queensland Location within Australia
- 27.4704°S 153.0238°E
- Location: 62 Queen Street, Brisbane City, City of Brisbane, Queensland, Australia

History
- Design period: 1870s–1890s (late 19th century)
- Built: 1883
- Built for: Colonial Mutual Life Assurance Society

Site notes
- Architect: Richard Gailey
- Architectural style: Gothic

Queensland Heritage Register
- Official name: 62 Queen Street, Colonial Mutual Chambers, Sussans Building
- Type: state heritage (built)
- Designated: 21 August 1992
- Reference no.: 600160
- Significant period: 1883 (fabric); 1883–1906 (historical)
- Builders: W McPark

Colonial Mutual Chambers is a heritage-listed office building at 62 Queen Street, Brisbane City, City of Brisbane, Queensland, Australia. It was designed by Richard Gailey and built in 1883 by W McPark. It is also known as Sussans Building. It was added to the Queensland Heritage Register on 21 August 1992.

== History ==
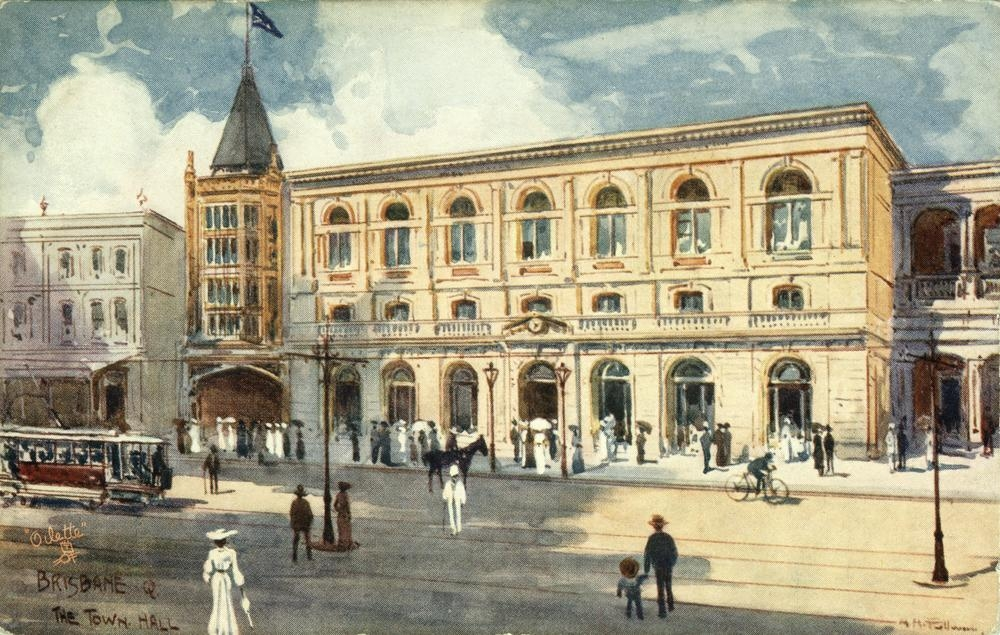
Colonial Mutual Chambers is the narrow building with tower and flag, on the left of the Brisbane Town Hall, circa 1895

This building was erected in 1883 for the Colonial Mutual Life Assurance Society who had acquired the site two years previously for £3,140.

The allotment was part of a larger site that previously contained buildings which were erected during the period Moreton Bay was a penal settlement. A government decision to demolish several convict era buildings, and to dispose of the crown land, gave impetus to the commercial redevelopment of the western side of Queen Street.

The building was designed by Richard Gailey and the contractor was W McPark. Gailey was responsible for the design of many of the commercial buildings in Brisbane during the 1880s that were characterised by Classical idioms and details, however in this building, he employed Gothic motifs. Sir Thomas McIlwraith, an early director of the company, laid the foundation stone in September 1883.

The Society occupied most of the building, which became known as the Colonial Mutual Chambers, and leased out the remaining floorspace. In 1906 Colonial Mutual moved its headquarters, but retained ownership of the building and continued to lease the premises. It was purchased in 1936 by the Carnegie family, dealers in quality musical instruments, and remained in the family until 1972. Since the 1960s the building has been used for offices on the upper levels and retail outlets on the ground floor.

A spire with flag pole and the lower sections of the flanking turrets have been removed. The skyline has been further altered by the removal of the attic rooms and the line of chimneys that rose above the wall adjoining the old Town Hall.

== Description ==
Colonial Mutual Chambers is a three storeyed rendered brick building with basement.

The facade is dominated by an oriel window supported by corbelling enriched with floral decoration. In the centre of the window running horizontally at second floor level is a band decorated with six different badges. Above this, mullions bisected by transoms divide the window into twenty-four lights. The head of each light is embellished with Gothic style tracery, composed of ogee curves. On both upper levels the windows extend from the floor to the ceiling. Decorated turrets flank the oriel window. The parapet is castellated and in the centre is a badge bearing the crest of the Society.

On each side of the oriel window are niches with ogee curved heads similar to the tracery. At both ends, the facade culminates in a turret. The turrets are decorated with tracery, bands of floral ornamentation and are surmounted with a finial. The turrets originally extended from the street level, but the lower sections have been removed. The parapet is castellated and in the centre is a badge bearing the crest of the Society.

The rear facade facing Burnett Lane is rendered brickwork lined to suggest stonework. There are four window openings, with sandstone sills, on each level. The window openings have Tudor arched heads which are emphasised by a continuous hood mould. One the rear facade one rectangular cast iron pipe and two nineteenth century rainwater heads survive.

Internally the building has had a mezzanine inserted above the ground floor level. An ornate pressed metal ceiling survives on the level above.

== Heritage listing ==
Colonial Mutual Chambers was listed on the Queensland Heritage Register on 21 August 1992 having satisfied the following criteria.

The place is important in demonstrating the evolution or pattern of Queensland's history.

Colonial Mutual Chambers is important in demonstrating the evolution and pattern of Queensland history, in particularly as evidence of the commercial redevelopment of Queen Street in the 1880s which took place as a result of the disposal of buildings erected during the penal era.

The place is important in demonstrating the principal characteristics of a particular class of cultural places.

Colonial Mutual Chambers is important in demonstrating the principal characteristics of an 1880s commercial building and the eclectic stylistic range of the work of architect Richard Gailey.

The place is important because of its aesthetic significance.

Colonial Mutual Chambers is important in exhibiting aesthetic characteristics valued by the community in particular as an 1880s commercial building incorporating a gothic facade, and the building's contribution to the Queen Street streetscape, which comprises a group of 19th and early 20th century buildings and facades.
