= Gardams Building =

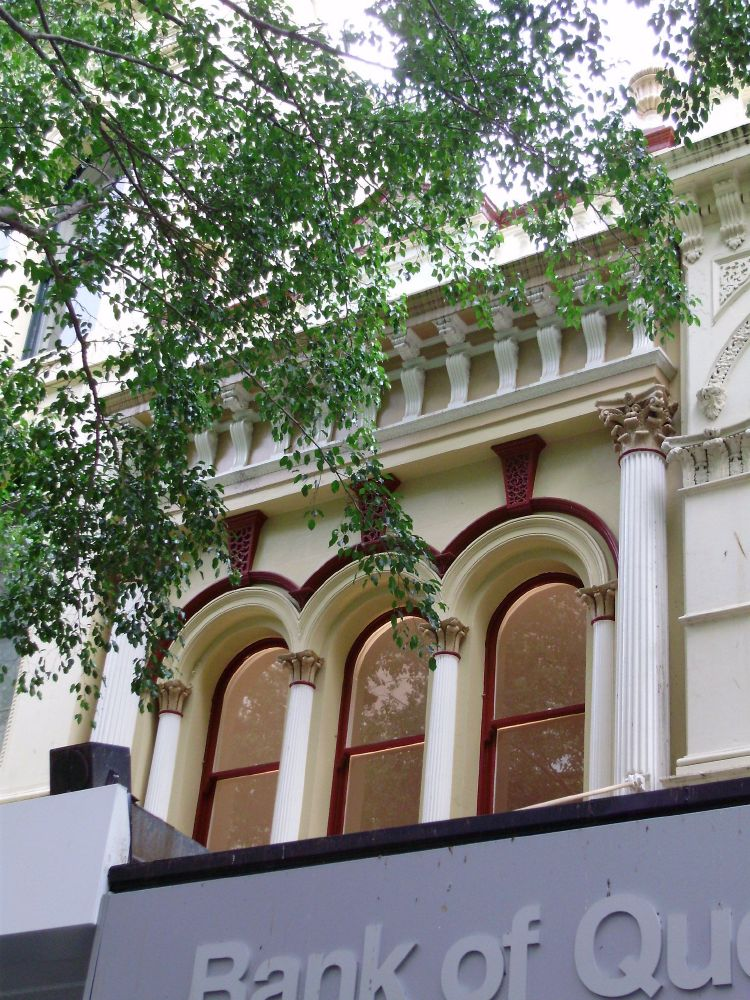
- Gardams Building, 2009

- Location within Queensland
- 27.4698°S 153.0246°E
- Location: 114 Queen Street, Brisbane City, City of Brisbane, Queensland, Australia

History
- Design period: 1870s–1890s (late 19th century)
- Built: 1881

Site notes
- Architectural style: Italianate

Queensland Heritage Register
- Official name: Gardams, Rutter and Sons
- Type: state heritage (built)
- Designated: 21 October 1992
- Reference no.: 600137
- Significant period: 1881 (fabric)

Gardams Building is a heritage-listed retail building at 114 Queen Street, Brisbane City, City of Brisbane, Queensland, Australia. It was built in 1881. It is also known as Rutter and Sons. It was added to the Queensland Heritage Register on 21 October 1992.

== History ==
This building was constructed in late 1881 and occupied by January 1882.

The deed of grant for allotment 11A was made to Auguste Deleuse in September 1881, following the 1880 demolition of the convict barracks which had occupied the site since 1827. A government decision to dispose of this Crown land prompted the redevelopment of that portion of the northern side of Queen street bounded by Albert Street and the first Brisbane Town Hall (now Country Comfort Hotel site). Deleuse erected a two storeyed building with basement, and negotiated a five-year lease with jeweller Thomas Gerrard.

Ownership of the property transferred to John Ferguson in April 1888. Ferguson, MLA for Rockhampton at the time, was also a building contractor and mining investor. His purchase of this site appears to have been speculative. After Fergusons death in 1906 title passed to various trustees who retained the site until its purchase by Gardams Silk Store Pty Ltd at auction in August 1950. Tenants at the time of sale were Rutter and Son, chemists, who had been there since the latter years of World War I.

In addition to the original building, another brick building with ground, mezzanine and two upper floors fronting Burnett Lane was included in the sale. Sewerage maps indicate a structure in that position from at least 1913. This building has been incorporated within the present Gardams premises. The building continued to be used by Gardams until the heritage listing in 1992. Gardams have subsequently relocated to another site. Since 2013, Flight Centre operate their Brisbane flagship store in the building.

== Description ==
Gardam's building is a small scale Victorian era commercial building that features some elaborate Italianate detailing. It has two storeys of stuccoed brick on a stone basement.

At street level the facade has been modernised with large plate glass shop windows and a recessed central entrance. However, the upper facade remains as it was when the building was constructed. Three window openings with round arched heads fill the upper facade. The elaborate hood moulds of the arches are carried by fluted pilasters with Corinthian capitals. This arrangement gives the impression of arcading on the upper facade. Within the openings are timber sash windows. Large stylised vermiculated keystones rise from the arches to support the cornice. At either end of the upper facade large fluted pilasters with Corinthian capitals also support the cornice.

The cornice is an elaborate element of the facade considering the size of the building. It has large brackets and ornamented dentils. Above the cornice is a parapet with a central triangular pediment. At the ends of the parapet are pedestals and an open Italianate balustrade runs between these and the pediment. Three large cast cement urns crown the pedestals and the pediment.

The building at the rear of the site fronting Burnett Lane was originally separate, but has been amalgamated with the front building during the present ownership. Evidence of this connection can be clearly seen from the upper level of the rear building. A connection has also been made at the first floor level in the front section of the building to allow access to the same level of the neighbouring Hardy Brothers building.

This example of a small scale Victorian commercial building is part of a surviving group of buildings of similar scale and detail from this era fronting Queen Street and as such contributes greatly to the streetscape.

== Heritage listing ==
Gardams was listed on the Queensland Heritage Register on 21 October 1992 having satisfied the following criteria.

The place is important in demonstrating the evolution or pattern of Queensland's history.

Gardams Building is significant as evidence of the secondary phase of development in Queen Street during the early 1880s, initiated by the disposal of the convict barracks.

The place is important in demonstrating the principal characteristics of a particular class of cultural places.

Gardams remains a good example of a small two-storeyed commercial building of the Victorian era with ornate detailing.

The place is important because of its aesthetic significance.

Aesthetically, it is significant as a part of a group of surviving 1880s commercial buildings which contribute to the streetscape of Queen Street.
