= Allan and Stark Building =

Heritage-listed building in Brisbane, Queensland

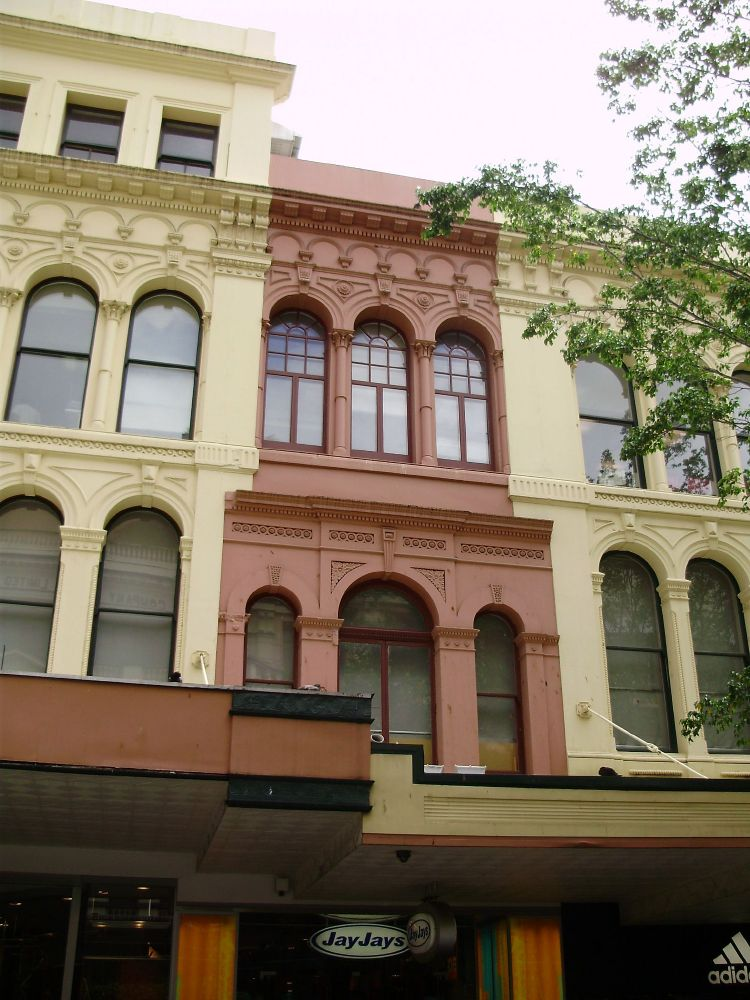
- The various facades of the former Allan and Stark building, 2009

- Location within Queensland
- 27.4699°S 153.0244°E
- Location: 110 Queen Street, Brisbane City, City of Brisbane, Queensland, Australia

Queensland Heritage Register
- Official name: Myer Store (former) [incorporating Miss Brisbane 600136], Allan and Stark
- Type: state heritage (built)
- Designated: 21 October 1992
- Reference no.: 600162
- Significant period: 1881–1923 (fabric); 1899–1970 (historical, Alan and Stark)

The Allan and Stark Building is a heritage-listed row of contiguous but not identical retail buildings located at 110 Queen Street, Brisbane City, City of Brisbane, Queensland, Australia. The architect was Andrea Stombuco. It was also known as Myer Store. It was added to the Queensland Heritage Register on 21 October 1992.

The individual buildings were constructed on various dates, but the earliest was in 1881. The drapery business operated by James Allan and Robert Stark first operated from part of the site in 1899 in leased premises. Up until 1964 the business gradually expanded into neighbouring buildings which were variously leased or purchased creating the row of buildings. Allan and Stark continued to operate from these amalgamated premises until 1970, when the buildings were sold to the retailer Myer. Myer operated its department store from the site until 1988.

The southernmost building of the row of buildings of Allan and Stark (the leftmost as seen from Queen Street) is visually quite different. It was formerly the Manwaring Building, the second of a row of 4 identical buildings built in 1888. The first building of that row (never part of the Allan and Stark building) is the former Palings Building which still survives adjacent to the Allan and Stark building. The third and fourth buildings of that row were demolished at some earlier time but their sites are now part of the Allan and Stark Building.

== History ==
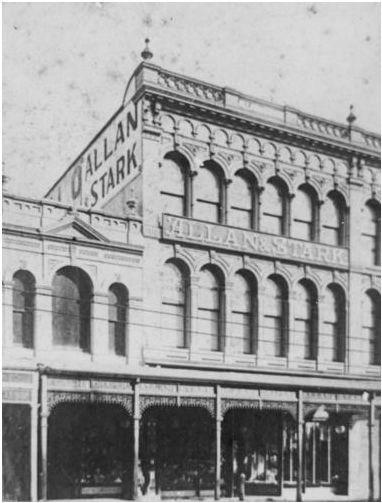
Allan and Stark drapery store, circa 1910

The former Myer Store consists of a series of buildings which were erected between 1881 and the early 1920s. A government decision to demolish the convict barracks which covered a large portion of this site, and to dispose of the Crown land, prompted the commercial redevelopment of the northern side of Queen Street bounded by Albert Street and the Brisbane Town Hall.

James Allan and Robert Stark began their drapery business in South Brisbane in 1882. Following severe flooding in 1893, Allan and Stark decided to move to the north side of the river. Leasing part of these Queen Street sites from 1899, the company gradually acquired the individual properties over a period of 65 years.

The building on allotment 8, designed by Andrea Stombuco, was erected in 1881 for solicitors Browne and Ruthning, and acquired by Allan and Stark in 1914. In 1918 two additional floors were built, corresponding to the adjacent property on allotment 8A.

The building on allotment 8A was erected in 1881 for A R Jones and occupied by a millinery and dressmaking firm and a photographic studio. It was purchased by Allan and Stark in April 1911 and two more floors were added in the same year.

Allotment 7 was developed in 1918 as part of the redevelopment of allotment 8.

Allotment 9 was purchased by Thomas Illidge in 1881 on which was built a two storey building. Allan and Stark began leasing this property in 1899, and in the late 1900s a third storey was added. Allan and Stark finally purchased the building in 1925.

In 1881–82 a three storeyed brick building, designed by Richard Gailey was erected on allotments 9,10,10A and 11 for Charles Lumley Hill and William Young. The building was initially leased to John and James Hislop, cabinet makers and upholsterers, and Watson, Ferguson and Co, stationers and lithographers. The floors of these buildings were supported by wrought iron girders allowing wider, open spaces for the tenancies. Allan and Stark acquired allotments 9A and 10 in August 1901. Allan and Stark leased the section of the building on allotments 10A and 1 from 1932 until 1952 when they purchased the property.

The southern end of the complex was acquired by Allan and Stark in 1965. This property was built in 1885 and designed by Richard Gailey. A three storeyed brick building, it comprised four common bays across the main facade, each representing individual tenancies for the building. An additional storey with pediment was erected between 1918 and 1923. Allan and Stark acquired the northern half of the building, and of the other two bays, one has been demolished and the other is Palings Building.

In 1970 Myer Queensland Stores Ltd purchased the Allan and Stark properties, and continued to use the complex as a department store. In 1988 the complex was vacated when the store moved to the Myer Centre directly opposite in the Queen Street Mall.

== Description ==
The former Myer Store, located in central Queen Street, comprises a series of contiguous three and four storeyed brick buildings. Despite being originally separate buildings, the rendered facade is given unity and coherence by the repetition of Classical details.

The main section of the facade features, on the upper levels, bays of arched openings separated by simple pilasters. On the second level the arches are supported by columns with rosette capitals, and on the third level the arches are supported by pilasters with Corinthian capitals. The string course and the cornice form unifying lines across the facade, although the number of arches for each bay and the spacing between them varies. Two bays of the building rise to a fourth storey with plain rectangular openings. The parapet, formerly with a balustrade and pedestals supporting vases, is now solid. A cantilevered street awning runs the length of the complex.

The southern bay differs from the rest of the facade with its finer and more decorative treatment. The openings on the second level are rectangular and separated by fluted pilasters, while on the third level the openings are arched and separated by Corinthian pilasters. There are ornamental keystones above the arches and the central keystones bear the initials "M" and "P" respectively for Manwaring and Paling, the original building owners. A prominent cornice with a course of large dentils runs across this section.

Internally, the building has been substantially altered. The original fabric is visible in some areas, including roof trusses and timber joists separated by herring-bone strutting. Ceilings of a variety of types of pressed metal and plaster remain visible in parts of the building.

== Heritage listing ==
The Allan and Stark Building was listed on the Queensland Heritage Register in 1992 when the occupier was the Myer store. Despite being part of the Allan and Stark Building, the Manwaring Building was also separately listed on the same register in 1992 when the current occupier was the Miss Brisbane store (a part of Myer department store for young women's clothing). Meanwhile, the Manwaring Building's "identical twin", the neighbouring Palings Building, is the subject of yet another heritage listing.

The Allan and Stark Building was listed on the Queensland Heritage Register on 21 October 1992 having satisfied the following criteria.

The place is important in demonstrating the evolution or pattern of Queensland's history.

The building provides evidence of the 1880s development of Queen Street initiated by the disposal of the former convict barracks.

The place is important because of its aesthetic significance.

The building is significant for its contribution, in scale, form, and style, to the Queen Street streetscape which comprises a group of nineteenth and early twentieth century buildings and facades.

The place has a special association with the life or work of a particular person, group or organisation of importance in Queensland's history.

The building is significant for its association with the firm Allan and Stark.
