= St Stephen's Chapel, Brisbane =

Heritage-listed building in Brisbane, Queensland

St Stephen's Chapel
- Old St Stephen's Church; Pugin Chapel
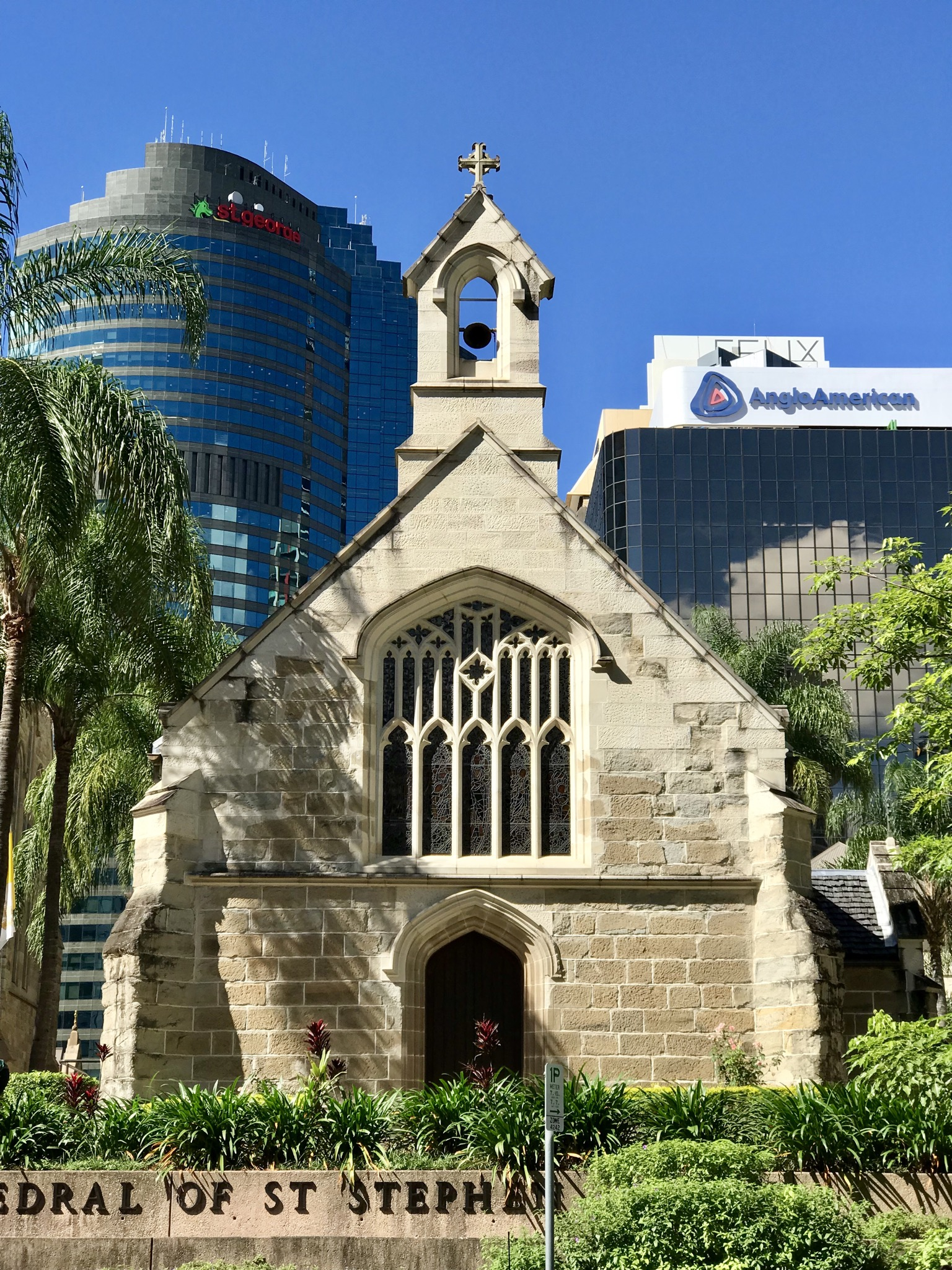
- St Stephen's Chapel, 2015
- St Stephen's Chapel
- 27°28′08″S 153°01′43″E
- Address: 249 Elizabeth Street, Brisbane City, City of Brisbane, Queensland
- Country: Australia
- Denomination: Roman Catholic
- Website: www.cathedralofststephen.org.au/st-stephens-chapel.html

History
- Status: Church (1850–1859); Cathedral (1859–1874); School (1874–1892); Various uses (1892–1999); Chapel (since 1999)
- Dedication: Saint Stephen
- Dedicated: 12 May 1850 (as a church); 5 February 1999 (as a chapel)

Architecture
- Functional status: Active
- Architect: Augustus Pugin
- Architectural type: Church
- Style: Gothic Revival
- Years built: 1848–1850

Specifications
- Materials: Sandstone; slate

Administration
- Archdiocese: Brisbane
- Parish: Cathedral Parish of St Stephen

Queensland Heritage Register
- Official name: Old St Stephen's Church, Pugin Chapel
- Type: State heritage (built)
- Designated: 21 October 1992
- Reference no.: 600108
- Significant period: 1848–1850 (fabric); 1850–1874, 1874–1892 (historical)
- Builders: Alexander Goold, Andrew Petrie

St Stephen's Chapel, also known as the Pugin Chapel, and formerly known as Old St Stephen's Church, is a heritage-listed Roman Catholic former church, now chapel, located at 249 Elizabeth Street, Brisbane City, City of Brisbane, Queensland, Australia. It was designed by Augustus Pugin and built from 1848 to 1850 by Alexander Goold and Andrew Petrie.

It was added to the Queensland Heritage Register on 21 October 1992, listed as Old St Stephen's Church, before it was rededicated as St Stephen's Chapel in 1999.

== History ==
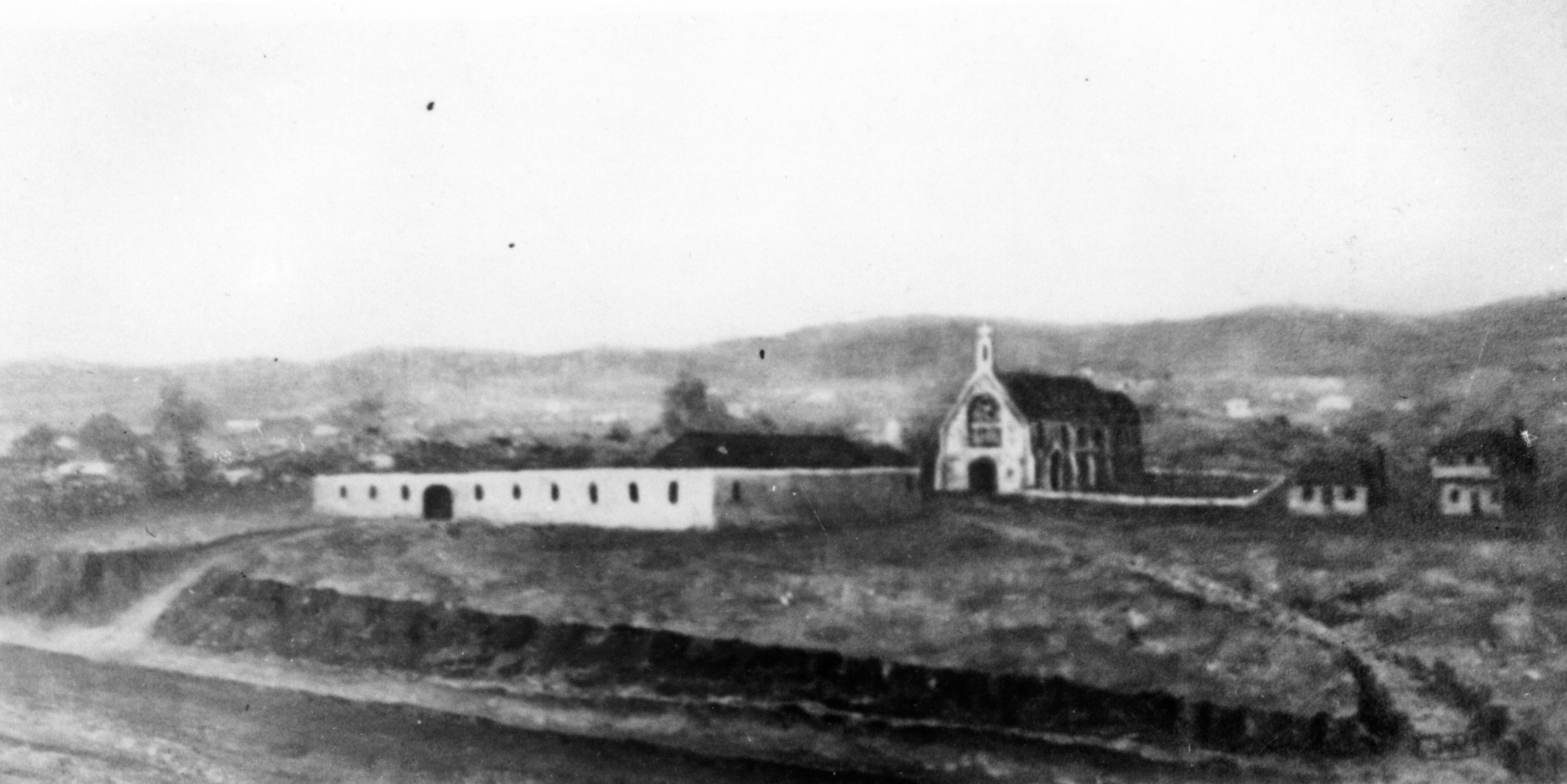
Female Convict Factory (on the site of the present Brisbane GPO) with St Stephen's behind

The land at the site was originally planned for church purposes in 1847. Six allotments of section 33 were set aside for the use of the Roman Catholic Church in September 1848 with the original deeds of grant being signed by New South Wales Governor Charles Fitzroy in November 1849 (Queensland did not separate from New South Wales until 1859).

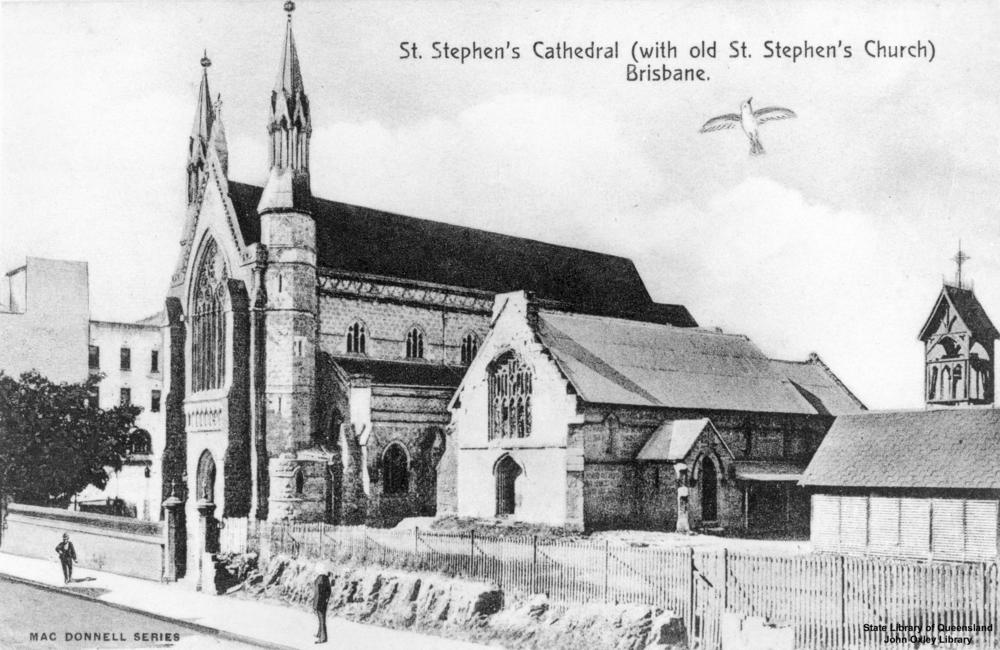
St. Stephen's Cathedral and Old St. Stephen's Church, circa 1910

From the early days of free settlement, Brisbane's Catholic population was significant with Catholics comprising 30% of residents in 1846. In 1849 and 1850 the New South Wales Government, under provisions of Governor Richard Bourke's 1836 Church Act, subsidised the building of Old St Stephen's Church which was opened on 12 May 1850. It was built by Alexander Goold, to a design attributed to the internationally renowned Gothic Revival architect Augustus Welby Pugin, a personal friend of Sydney-based Archbishop Bede Polding.

With the growth of Brisbane's Catholic community and with Separation approaching, the Roman Catholic Archdiocese of Brisbane was created in 1859. Old St Stephen's became a cathedral but its capacity became increasingly inadequate and on 26 December 1863, Bishop James Quinn laid the foundation stone for a new cathedral. In the eleven years it took to finish the new St Stephen's Cathedral, provision was made for extra space in the old church. A wooden annexe was built onto the northern frontage and extra doorways were cut in the stone wall on this side. Inadequate accommodation was not the only problem, for the soft sandstone was crumbling, particularly that of the little belfry which had to be dismantled at some time before 1875. A temporary wooden belfry was erected to a design by architect A. B. Wilson in 1888.

After the consecration of the new cathedral in 1874, the old church was used as a school by the Christian Brothers until they moved to their new site at Gregory Terrace in 1880. The Sisters of Mercy then conducted a school in the old church building until the permanent St Stephen's School was opened in 1892. Since that time the building has been variously used as a storeroom, offices, display space, meeting area and choir practice room.

On a number of occasions, the demolition of the old church was contemplated. However, it was finally decided to restore it as a place of worship. Based on historical evidence, restoration was done to recreate the bell tower, the stone tracery in the windows and the timber shingle roof. A stained glass window depicting Jesus Christ and the story of St Stephen was placed in the west window. The furniture can be re-arranged to suit a variety of church services, weddings, spiritual talks and sacred music performances. The nave is separated from the apse by four timber panels and a rood bar with a crucifix in the midpoint. The apse space contains a shrine of Saint Mary MacKillop. On 5 February 1999, the church was re-dedicated as St Stephen's Chapel by Archbishop John Bathersby.

== Description ==
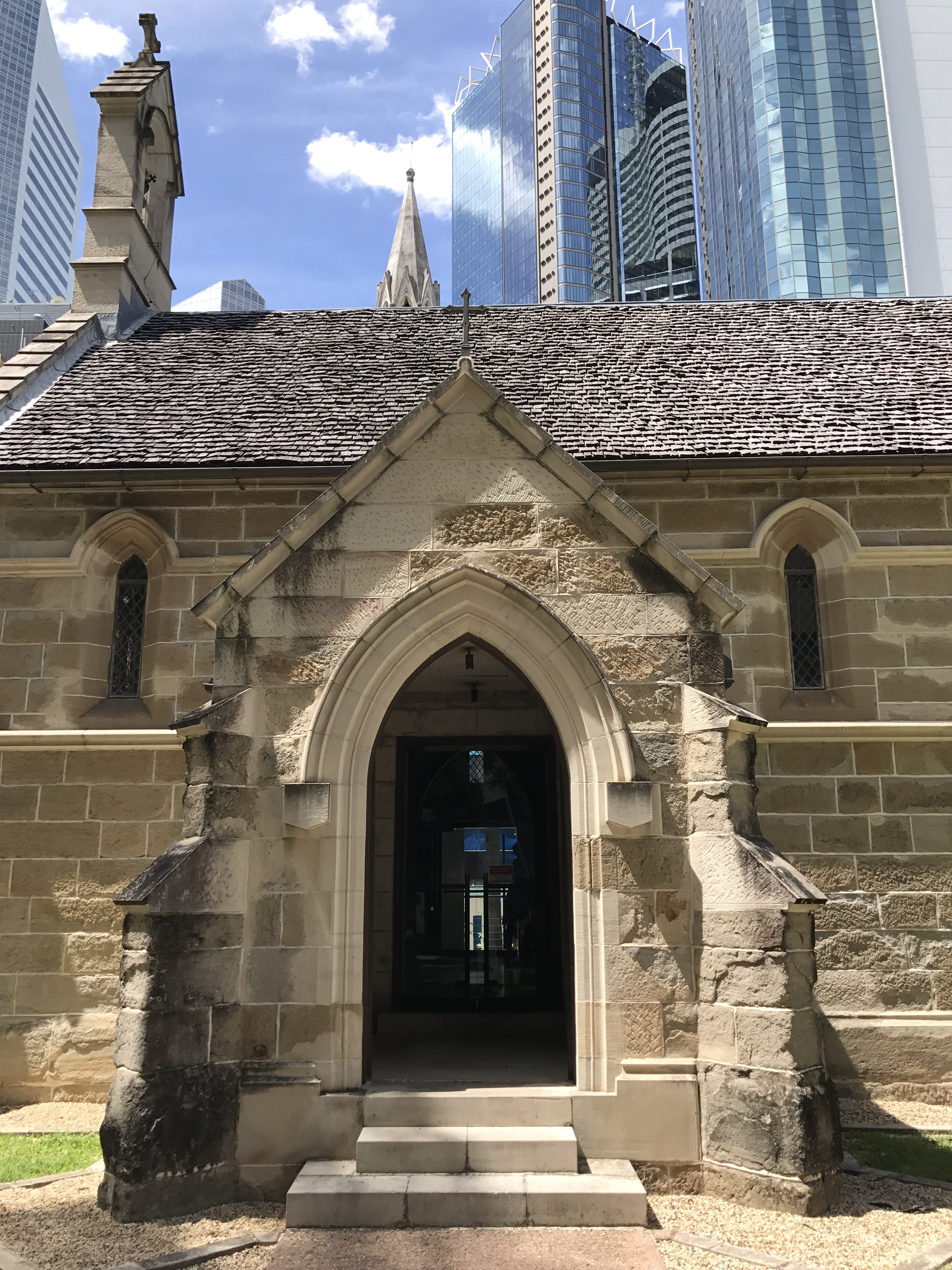
Side entrance, 2017

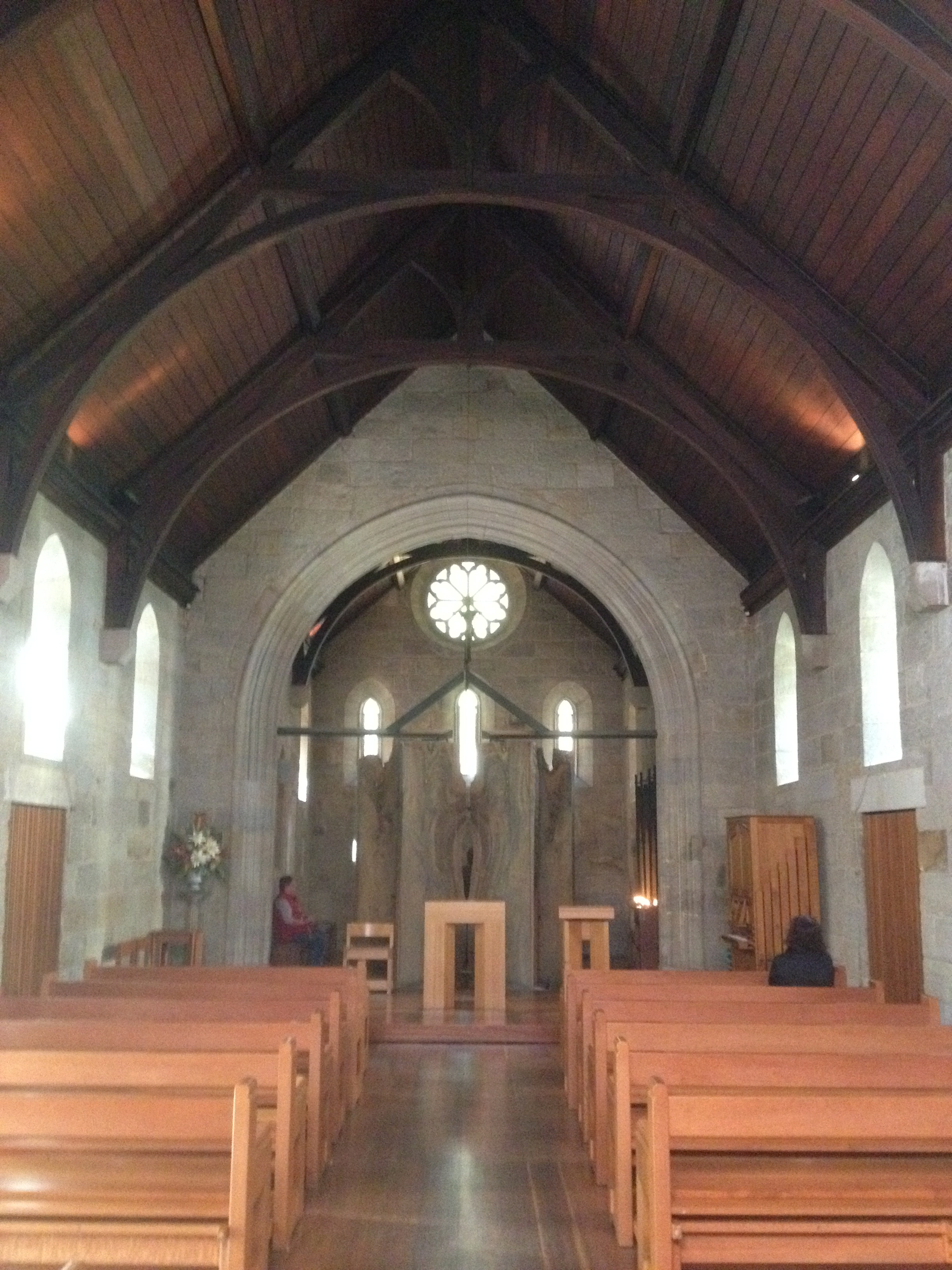
St Stephen's Chapel interior, 2014

The chapel is made of locally quarried sandstone and originally had a shingled roof, now slate. It conforms to a standard English type of small church with a simple rectangular nave with a square chancel attached via an arch. A little square sacristy is attached to the north side of the chancel and a square porch gives onto the south-west end of the nave.

Externally the elevations are extremely simple with an unadorned ashlar lower section with small lancets let into the wall above a roll moulding to form a clerestory. The chancel has a small rose in the gable with three lancets below.

The west end of the chapel has a simple but attractive perpendicular window in the upper section with a door in the lower section. The original stone tracery of the window has been replaced with wood. Externally the sandstone has weathered badly. A small stone bell tower was once mounted above the western gable but was taken down before 1875. Internally the chapel has fine Gothic proportions. It has finely crafted timber trusses with collar ties and a timber ceiling above. The stonework has been painted and the ecclesiastical accoutrements removed.

St Stephen's Chapel is located towards the front of the site facing Elizabeth Street and south of the Cathedral. The open space surrounding the chapel is enclosed to each side by the southern elevation of the Cathedral, the rear of the buildings facing Edward Street and the back of St Stephen's Girls' School. This is an open grassy area that is now planted with rows of palm trees and crossed by concrete paths as part of the 1989 project involving the renovation of the Cathedral.

== Heritage listing ==
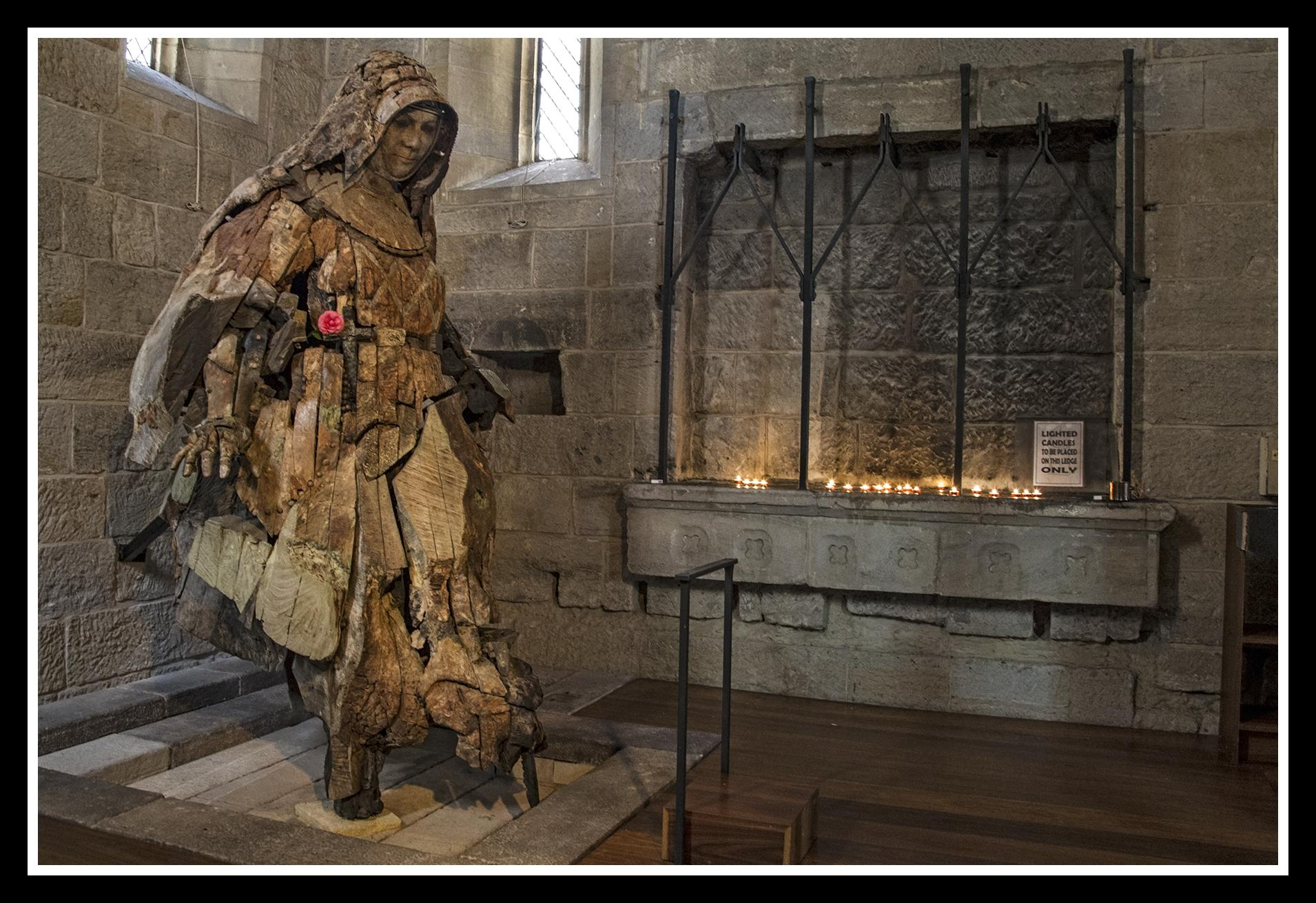
Statue of Mary of the Cross MacKillop

Old St Stephen's Church was listed on the Queensland Heritage Register on 21 October 1992 having satisfied the following criteria.

The place is important in demonstrating the evolution or pattern of Queensland's history.

Old St Stephen's Church is significant as the oldest surviving church building in Brisbane and provides evidence of construction techniques used in Brisbane in the 1840s.

The place is important in demonstrating the principal characteristics of a particular class of cultural places.

Old St Stephen's Church is significant as the oldest surviving church building in Brisbane and provides evidence of construction techniques used in Brisbane in the 1840s.

Old St Stephen's Church is an example of a small stone English Gothic Revival church and is an example of the first churches erected in Brisbane with permanence in mind.

The place is important because of its aesthetic significance.

Old St Stephen's Church is significant as part of a group of prominent ecclesiastical buildings of which this is the earliest component.

The place has a strong or special association with a particular community or cultural group for social, cultural or spiritual reasons.

Old St Stephen's Church is important for its association with a religious group of significance in the early settlement of Brisbane. The Church is continues to be a building held in high esteem by both the Catholic community and the general public.

The place has a special association with the life or work of a particular person, group or organisation of importance in Queensland's history.

Old St Stephen's Church is significant as an example of the work of a prominent early builder, Andrew Petrie, and as the product of a design attributed to renowned British architect, Augustus Pugin.
