= Hardy Brothers =

Australian retailer of jewellery, watches etc

- Type: Private
- Industry: Retail
- Founded: 1853, Sydney, Australia
- Founder: John Hardy
- Headquarters: Brisbane, Australia
- Area served: Sydney; Brisbane; Melbourne; Perth; Gold Coast
- Products: Jewellery, timepieces and decorative arts
- Website: Official website

Hardy Brothers is a specialty retailer and private company of fine jewellery, timepieces and decorative arts in Australia. Its historic products are now highly collectible and are held in state and national collections. It is the only Australian jewellery business to hold a royal warrant and since 1980 until has produced the Melbourne Cup.

== History ==
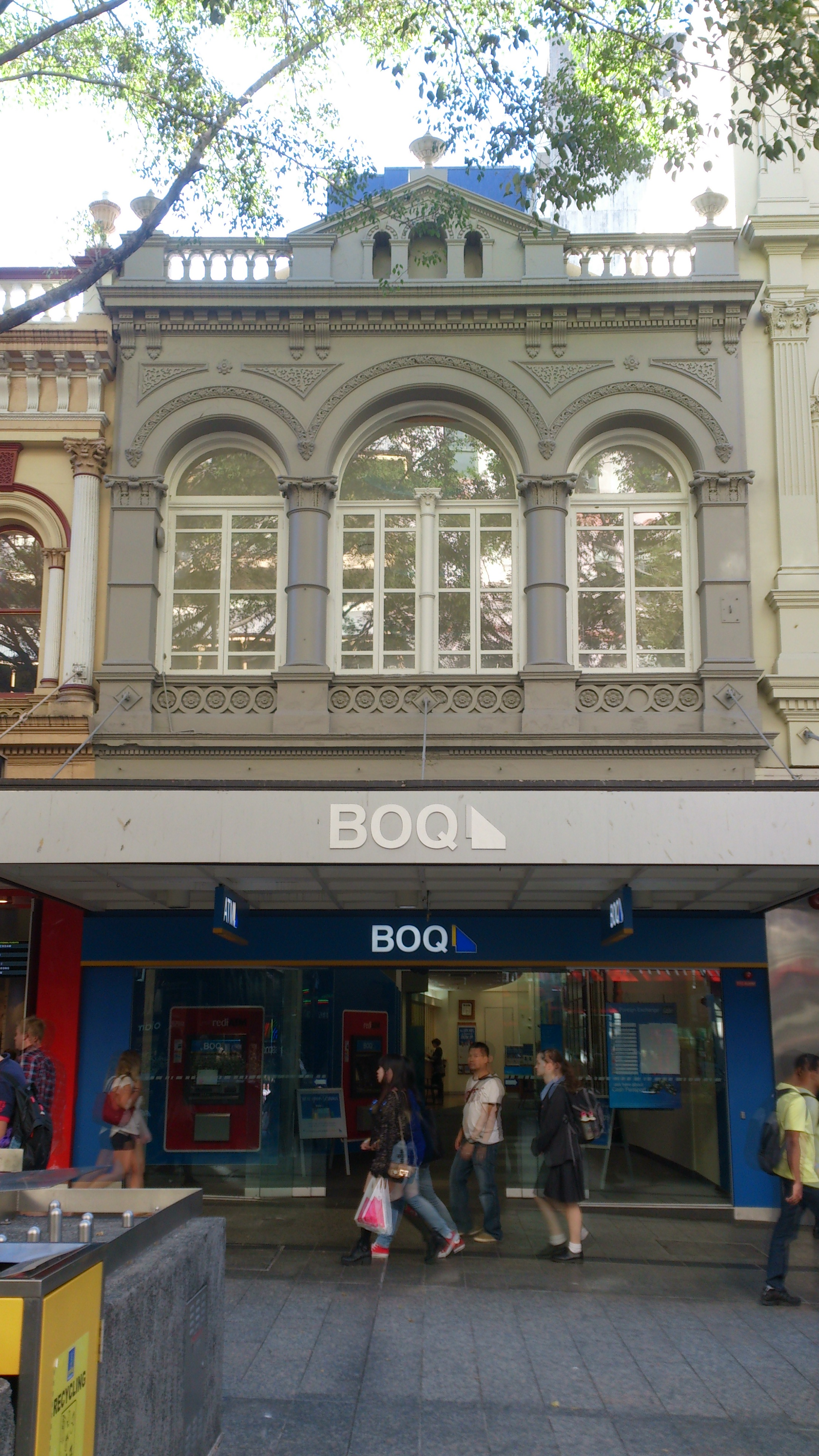
Former Hardy Brothers Building, Queen Street, Brisbane, 2014

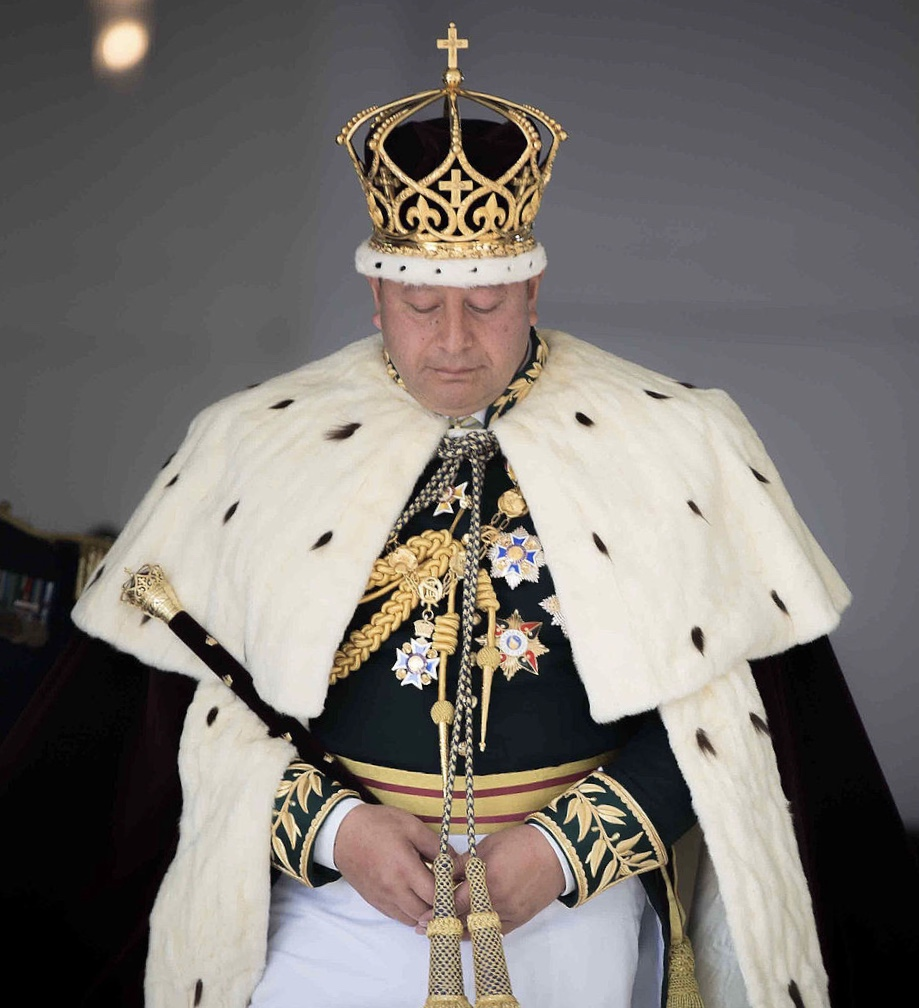
Crown of Tonga made by the Hardy Brothers in 1873, as worn by King Tupou VI at his coronation (2015)

Hardy Brothers was founded in 1853 by Jeweller John Hardy, an Englishman newly arrived in Sydney, NSW, Australia. In 1855, the business moved to Hunter Street, Sydney, NSW and remained there until 1935. In 1894, the business expanded to Queensland with the opening of a store in Queen Street, Brisbane (now heritage-listed as the Hardy Brothers Building).

A store was opened in Collins Street, Melbourne, in 1918. In 1929, Hardy Brothers were appointed jewellers by royal warrant to His Majesty King George V. The business remained in family control until 1974 and was then taken over in 1980 by Qintex and controlled by that company until 1988. It was then bought by the McKinney family and lastly by Wallace Bishop in 1997. Wallace Bishop is a family owned jewellery company established in 1917 and now run by the fourth generation. Stuart Bishop is the current CEO.

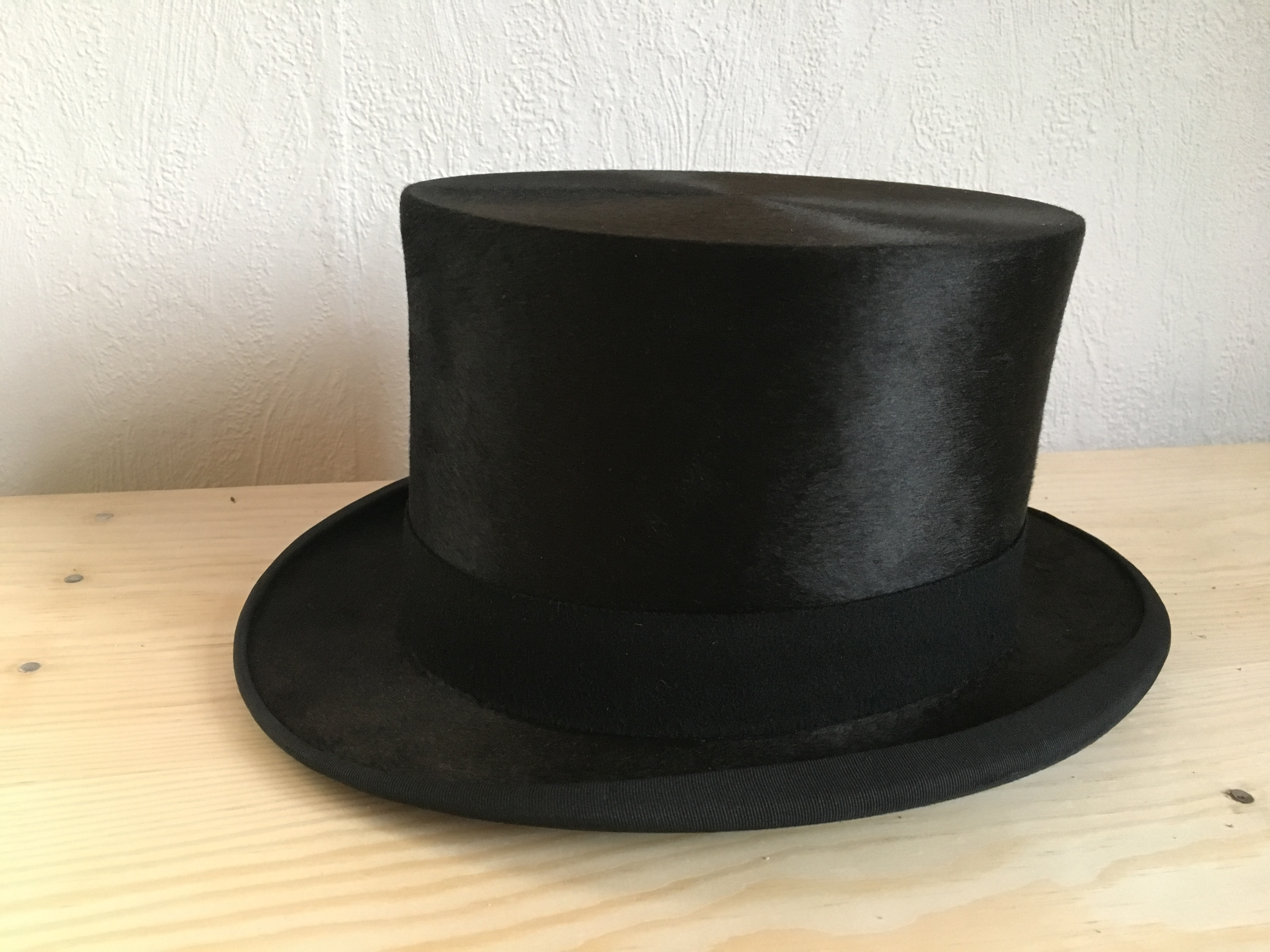
Top hat from Hardy Brothers.

== Managing directors ==
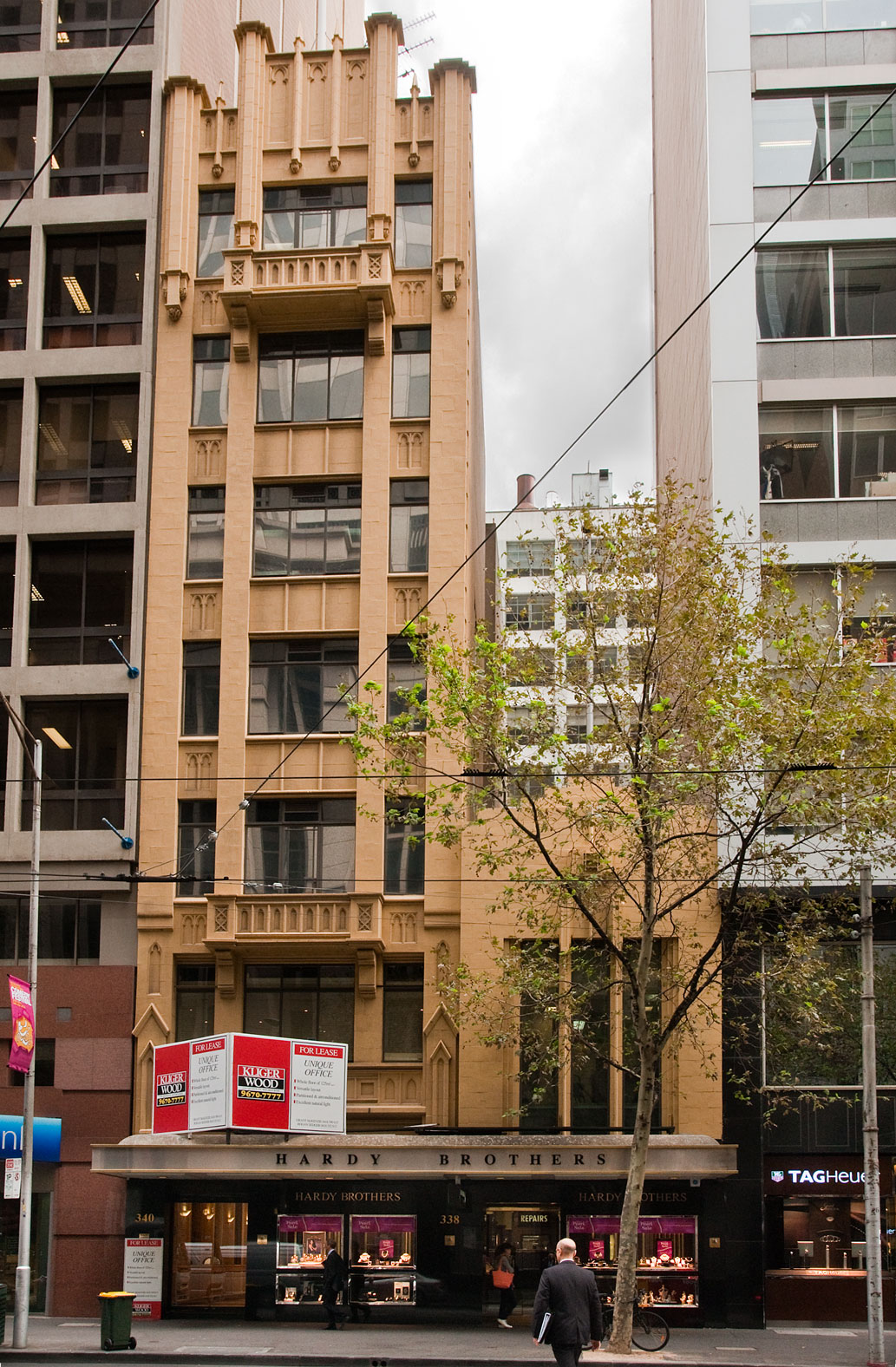
The Collins Street Melbourne Store

- John Hardy
- Walter Hardy
- Percy Hardy
- Richard Hardy

== Chief executives ==
- Jack Leckie
- Harry Quayle
- Arthur Sims
- John McKinney
- Stuart Bishop

== Stores ==
- 189 Edward Street, Brisbane
- 60 Castlereagh Street, Sydney
- 338 Collins Street, Melbourne
- Shop T16-18, Raine Square, Perth
- Shop 2707 Pacific Fair, Gold Coast
