= Moorlands, Auchenflower =

Moorlands
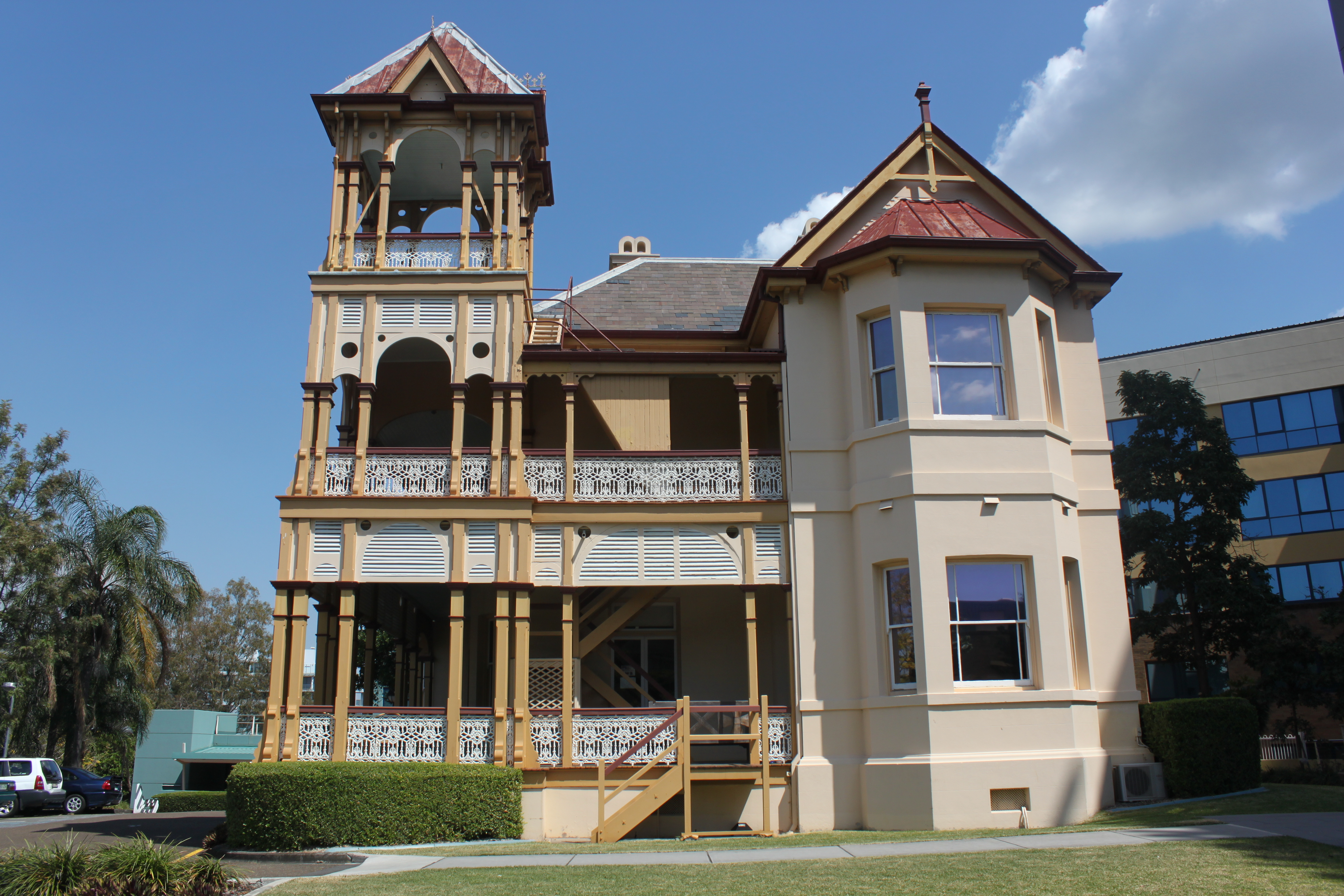
- Moorlands, 2012

- Location within Queensland Location within Australia
- 27.479°S 152.9986°E
- Location: 451 Coronation Drive, Auchenflower, Queensland, Australia

History
- Design period: 1870s–1890s (late 19th century)
- Built: c. 1892

Site notes
- Architect: Richard Gailey

Queensland Heritage Register
- Official name: Moorlands
- Type: state heritage (landscape, built)
- Designated: 21 August 1992
- Reference no.: 600052
- Significant period: 1890s (fabric); 1890s–1960s (historical)
- Significant components: residential accommodation – main house, gate – entrance, stained glass window/s, views to, cellar, service wing, tower – observation/lookout, views from, trees/plantings
- Builders: Arthur Smith

Moorlands is a heritage-listed villa at 451 Coronation Drive, Auchenflower, Queensland, Australia. It was designed by Richard Gailey and was built c. 1892 by contractor Arthur Smith. It was added to the Queensland Heritage Register on 21 August 1992.

== History ==
Moorlands was constructed in 1892 for the Mayne family of Brisbane. It replaced an earlier timber residence on the site which was known as Moorlands Villa.

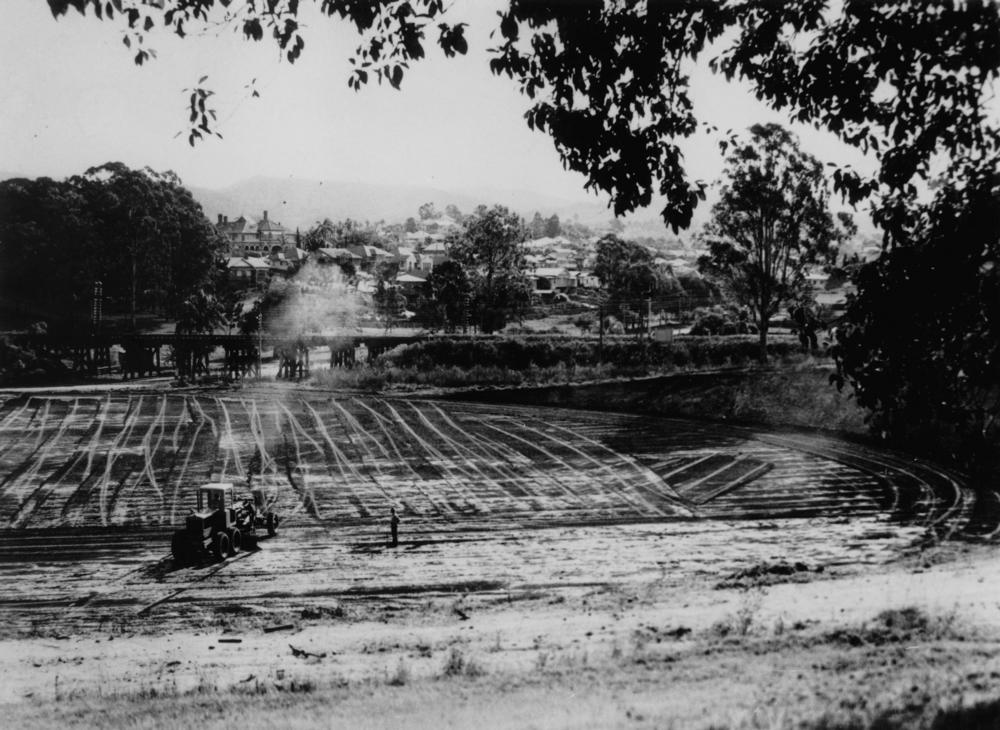
Moorland Park, 1948

Mary Mayne, widow of Patrick Mayne, had purchased the earlier house and 15 acres (6.1 hectares) in 1876. Patrick Mayne was a prominent Brisbane resident in the 1860s-1870s who owned a butcher shop in Queen Street, served as an alderman of the Brisbane Municipal Council and speculated in property. Mary Mayne and her five children resided in Moorlands Villa until her death in September 1889.

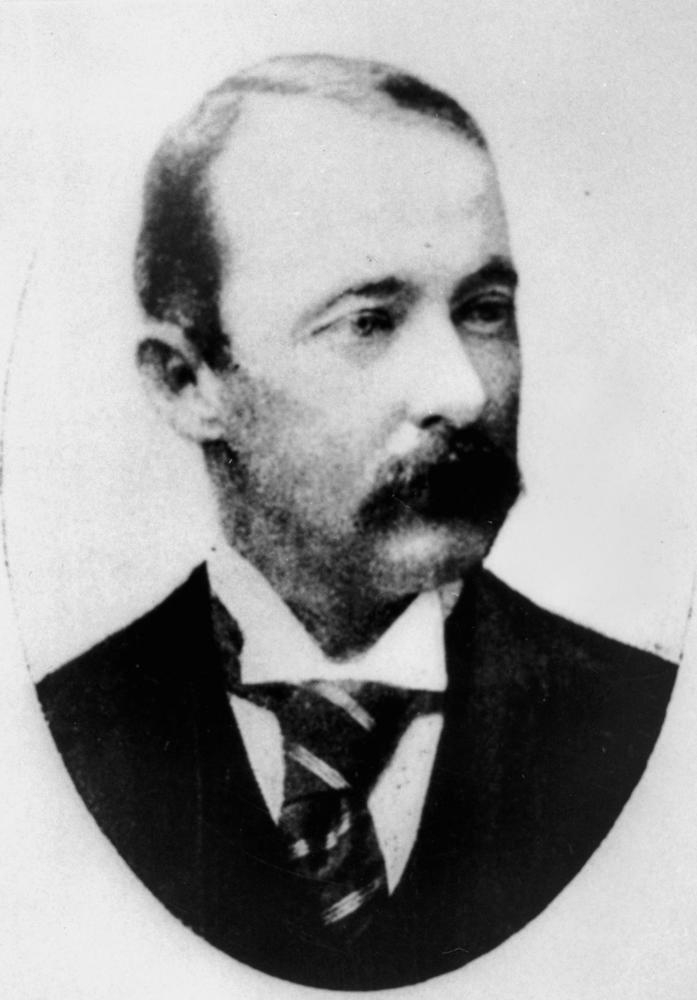
Dr James O'Neil Mayne

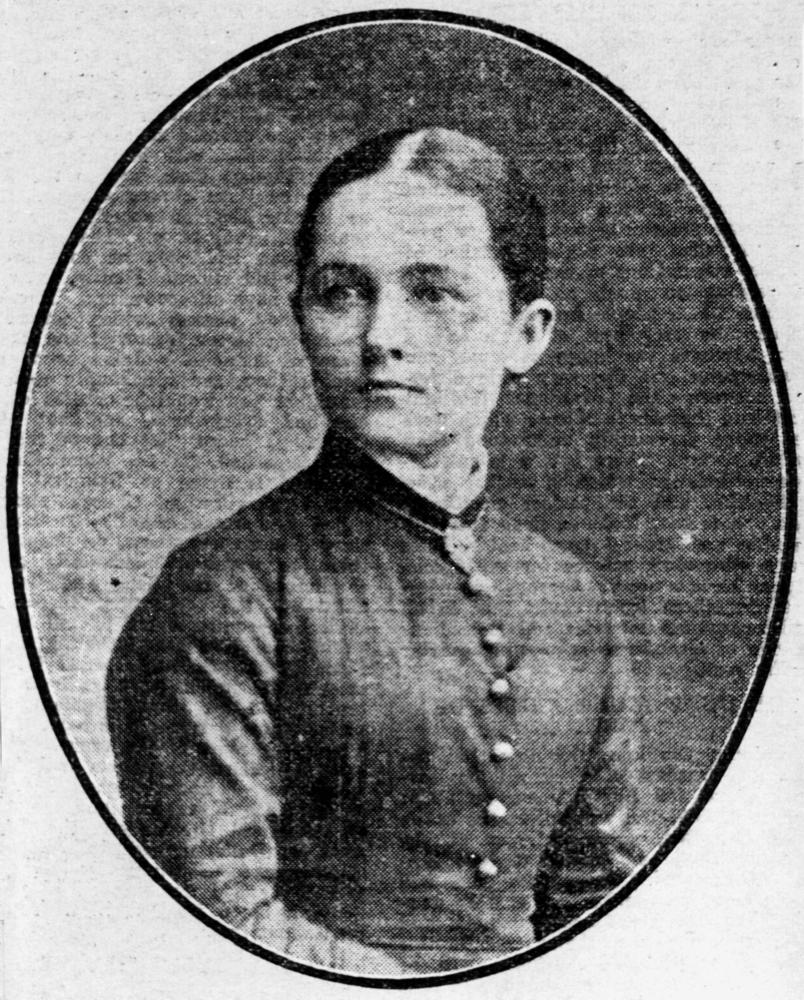
Mary Emelia Mayne, 1926

Four of the children, James, William, Isaac and Mary Emelia, continued to occupy the property and decided to build a new house. The foundation stone was laid by Mary Emelia Mayne on 3 June 1892. Beneath this was placed a time capsule, enclosing newspapers of the day and a statement explaining why the house was being built.

The building was designed by architect Richard Gailey, and erected by contractor Arthur Smith. The ground floor contained porch, vestibule, staircase hall, drawing room, parlour, dining room, smoking room, cloakroom, serving room, pantries and kitchen. The basement housed cellars, dairy, stores and laundry. A vestibule, ten bedrooms and several bathrooms were located on the first floor.

Moorlands remained the property of the Mayne family until 1940, when it was bequeathed to the University of Queensland, to which the family also had donated funds in the 1920s to purchase the St Lucia campus.

United States service personnel occupied Moorlands during World War II and several army-style huts remain in the grounds. In 1947 the building was sold to the Brisbane branch of the Legacy War Widows and Orphans Fund, and accommodated war-orphaned children and widows until 1971.

The Methodist (later Uniting) Church bought the property in 1971 and the Wesley Hospital, which opened in March 1977, was built in the grounds behind the house. Moorlands was renovated and converted to office accommodation for the Blue Nursing Service. It is now the head office of the Uniting Church's Division of Aged Care and Domiciliary Services.

Following road widening in the 1970s the front fencing was removed and the gates and gate posts (replicas of the originals) were relocated higher up the hill.

== Description ==
Moorlands is a large, two storeyed, rendered brick building, with timber belvedere and an attached service wing to the rear. It stands prominently on a hill overlooking the Brisbane River at the Toowong Reach, in substantial grounds fronting Coronation Drive.

The main roof is clad with slate, but the steep turreted roof of a corner observation tower is sheeted in broad-profile galvanised iron. Four double chimney stacks rise above the roofline.

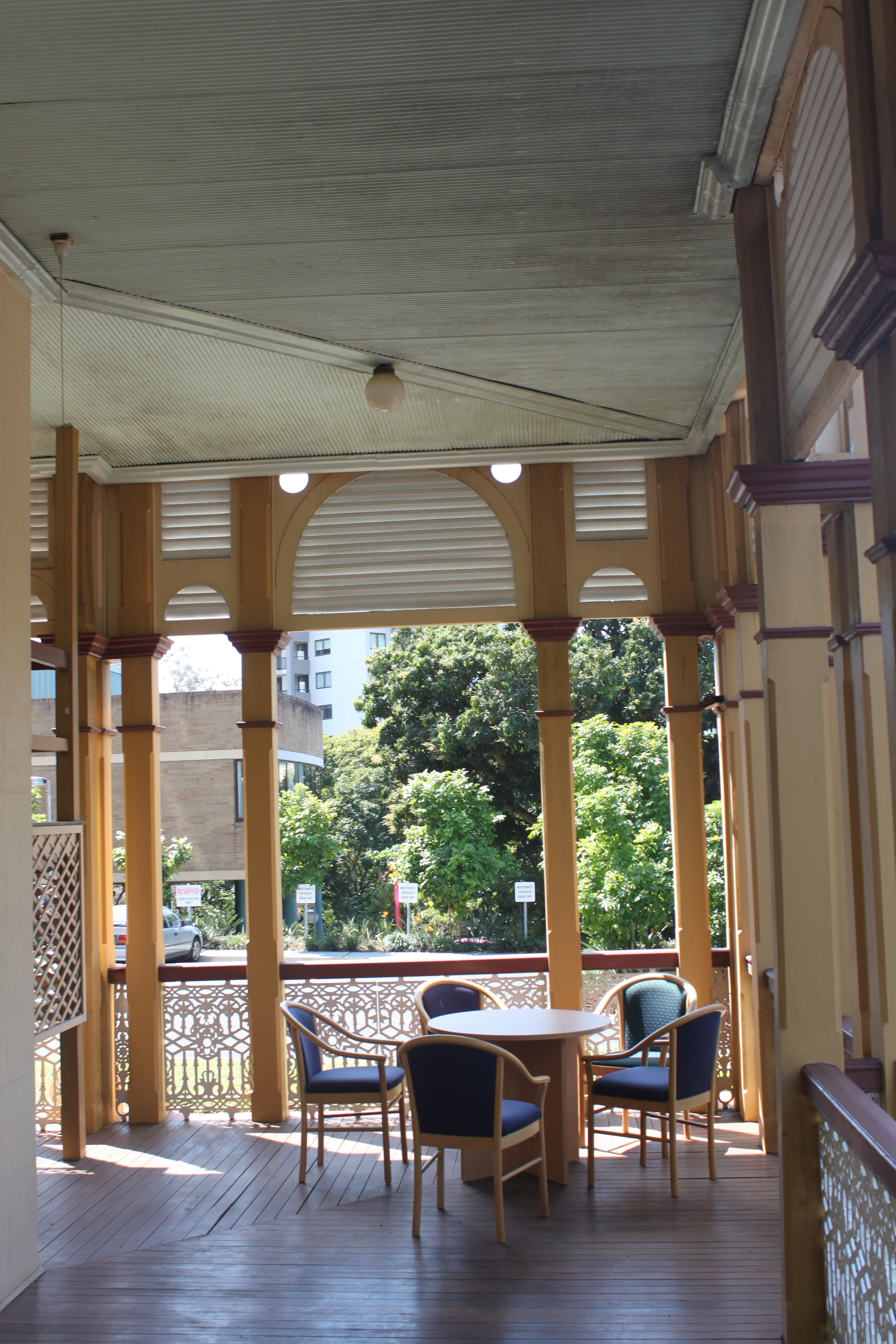
Verandahs at Moorlands, 2012

The southeast and northeast elevations, with views of the river, feature verandahs on both levels, an elaborate timber belvedere at the corner, and a projecting gable with bay windows in the front (southeastern) elevation. The verandahs and tower are detailed with double timber posts with shared capitals and timber brackets, a balustrading of fine cast iron, and a timber valance.

Internally the walls and high ceilings are plastered and painted, with plaster ceiling roses in every room and arches in the hallways and in front of the bay windows.

The principal rooms feature elaborate cornices, paper friezes and timber moulding picture rails, which once were decorated in polychrome and gilding. Only the principal front room retains the original decoration.

Most rooms contain a fireplace with glazed ceramic tiles and a marble surround. Extensive cedar joinery (particularly the fine staircase and folding doors on the ground floor), is employed throughout the interior. Fretwork balustrading panels in the stairwell feature the intertwined letters PM and on the base newel are carved the Latin words "sursum corda" (translation "Lift up your hearts"). The stairwell is lit by a large stained glass window of elaborate design.

The internal arrangement of rooms survives, including the cellars beneath the kitchen.

A number of mature trees including bunya, poinciana and jacaranda are remnants of an earlier landscaped garden. The multi-storeyed Wesley Hospital complex is situated adjacent to the building.

== Heritage listing ==
Moorlands was listed on the Queensland Heritage Register on 21 August 1992 having satisfied the following criteria.

The place is important in demonstrating the evolution or pattern of Queensland's history.

Moorlands is important in demonstrating the principal characteristics of a substantial 1890s brick residence.

Moorlands is important in exhibiting aesthetic characteristics valued by the community, in particular its landmark quality, contribution to the Coronation Drive streetscape and to the riverscape of the Toowong Reach of the Brisbane River.

Moorlands has special association with the Mayne family, major benefactors of the University of Queensland, and with the domestic work of architect Richard Gailey.

The place is important in demonstrating the principal characteristics of a particular class of cultural places.

Moorlands is important in demonstrating the principal characteristics of a substantial 1890s brick residence.

The place is important because of its aesthetic significance.

Moorlands is important in exhibiting aesthetic characteristics valued by the community, in particular its landmark quality, contribution to the Coronation Drive streetscape and to the riverscape of the Toowong Reach of the Brisbane River.

The place has a special association with the life or work of a particular person, group or organisation of importance in Queensland's history.

Moorlands has special association with the Mayne family, major benefactors of the University of Queensland, and with the domestic work of architect Richard Gailey.
