= Frederick William Whitehouse =

Australian geologist

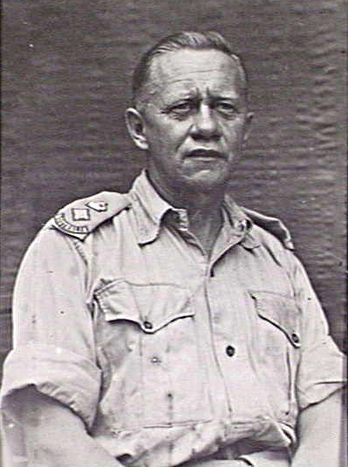
- F. W. Whitehouse, Morotai, 1945
- Born: 20 December 1900; Ipswich, Queensland, Australia
- Died: 22 March 1973 (aged 72); Brisbane, Queensland, Australia
- Education: Ipswich Grammar School, University of Queensland, St John's, Cambridge
- Awards: Walter Burfitt prize and medal
- Scientific career
- Fields: Geologist, Naturalist

Frederick William Whitehouse (20 December 1900 – 22 March 1973) was a noted geologist, born in Ipswich, Queensland, Australia.

== Life ==
Raised in Ipswich to Frederick William Whitehouse senior and Florence Amelia Terrey, he was the oldest of five children. His parents owned a successful cake and catering business in Ipswich.

Separate to education, a professional career, and military service in WWII, 'Freddy' Whitehouse was active adventurer, having climbed several mountains in south-east Queensland, setting several mountaineering records. As a party of three, he succeeded in climbing the entire ten of the Glass House Mountains peaks in one day. Whitehouse also served as the president of the University Musical and Dramatic Societies, and managed the rowing crew of the University of Queensland.

By 1932, 'Doc' Whitehouse was a Rover Scout leader for the Boy Scouts in Brisbane, later rising to deputy commissioner in 1954.

In 1955, he was convicted with a suspended sentence for a charge involving a younger man. Dismissed from the university in the same year, after repeated efforts, the charges were struck out in March 1957. Whitehouse was later subject to a chapter in Matthew Condon's Little fish are sweet, although these contents have been debated.

Whitehouse never married, and died in 1973 in Brisbane.

== Education ==
Whitehouse attended Ipswich Grammar School, and went on to study at the University of Queensland. He graduated with a BSc, with first-class Honours in geology and mineralogy from the University of Queensland in 1922, and a government gold medal for outstanding merit.

In 1922, he won a University Foundation Travelling scholarship to St John's College, University of Cambridge, where he took his PhD in 1925, the first person from Queensland to take a PhD from Cambridge. Dorothy Hill in her obituary for Whitehouse, would note that of his graduating class at Ipswich Grammar School, three students would become Rhodes scholars at Oxford, while he himself won his scholarship to Cambridge. His thesis was on marine Cretaceous sequences of Australia. He and fellow student Dorothy Hill, had collected many fossils during their studies at UQ, which had advanced their individual and shared research in the field.

He was awarded a DSc in 1939 for the outstanding pioneer work on Cambrian period trilobites of the Georgina Basin which gained him international recognition.

== Career ==
On his return to Queensland, Whitehouse was appointed government geologist. In 1926, he began lecturing in geology at the University of Queensland; over three decades he was to alternate between working for the State government and the university. He helped to map the geology of western Queensland while studying the region's fossil fauna. In 1940, he was president of the Royal Society of Queensland. In 1941 he was awarded the Royal Society of New South Wales's Walter Burfitt prize and medal for his work on the stratigraphy of the Great Artesian Basin.

In 1946–47, Whitehouse was seconded to the Department of the Co-ordinator-General of Public Works; he was a member of the committee on post-war reconstruction and was involved with the northern Australia development project. He resumed lecturing at the University of Queensland in 1948, and was promoted to associate-professor in 1949. Continuing his studies on the stratigraphy of the artesian basin, he described the natural leakage from the system, particularly the mound springs. This was probably his most significant contribution to geology, and was published as an appendix, 'The Geology of the Queensland Portion of the Great Australian Artesian Basin', in the report, Artesian Water Supplies in Queensland (1954). He was also interested in quaternary geomorphology.

Whitehouse was Associate Professor of Geology, University of Queensland (1949–1955). He gave a long (1934–1953) series of nationally broadcast lectures and news reviews over the ABC on a wide range of geological topics. He strove to introduce geology more widely to Queensland schools and compiled and freely circulated 50 different geological pamphlets, which described the geology of the area in which a school resided. He provided several identified sets of rocks, minerals and fossils to more than 100 schools. Whitehouse served as the president of the Geological section of the Australian and New Zealand Association for the Advancement of Science.

Whitehouse was dismissed from the university in 1955. He continued to work as a geological consultant for many oil companies from 1955, and was president of the Anthropological Society of Queensland from 1972 to 1973. He was a leading member of the Brisbane Aquarium Society, and a bryologist. He was also instrumental (as is detailed in The Mayne Inheritance) of gaining the major bequest of land, which enabled relocation of the university to its Saint Lucia site. Whitehouse was a close friend of Dr James O'Neil Mayne (1861–1939), who with his sister Mary Emelia Mayne purchased land in Saint Lucia in 1926, which was to become the new site of the University of Queensland.

== Military service ==
On 7 July 1941 Whitehouse enlisted in the AIF. Commissioned a lieutenant, Royal Australian Engineers, in January 1942, he applied his geological knowledge to road-building in Queensland and New Guinea in 1942–43, and to formulating procedures for amphibious assaults across coral reefs in 1944–45. He travelled extensively in the South-West Pacific Area and in September 1945 rose to temporary lieutenant colonel. Mentioned in dispatches for his work, he was demobilised on 21 December 1945.

== Published works ==
Whitehouse, F. W. (1924). Dimitobelidae-a new family of Cretaceous Belemnites. Geological magazine, 61: 410–416.

Whitehouse, F. W. (1926a). The Cretaceous Ammonoidea of eastern Australia. Memoirs of the Queensland Museum, 8: 195–242.

Whitehouse, F. W. (1926b). The correlation of the marine Cretaceous deposits of Australia. Reports of the Australasian Association for the Advancement of Science, 18: 275–280.

Whitehouse, F. W. (1927, 1928). Additions to the Cretaceous Ammonite fauna of eastern Australia. Memoirs of the Queensland Museum, 9: 109–120; 200–206.

Whitehouse, F. W. (1928). Central Queensland geology. Queensland government mining journal, 29: 441–442.

Whitehouse, F. W. (1930). The geology of Queensland in Handbook for Queensland. Australasian Association for the Advancement of Science: 23–39.

Whitehouse, F. W. (1930). Report on a collection of fossils made by Mr J. H. Reid, in the Springsure district. Queensland government mining journal, 31: 156–157.

Whitehouse, F. W. (1931). Some notes on the Mesozoic plants collected by C. C. Morton, near North Arm. Queensland government mining journal, 32: 274.

Whitehouse, F. W. (1931). Report of the palaeontologist. Annual Report of the Department of Mines Queensland 1930: 141–142.

Whitehouse, F. W. (1933). Notes on the Permo-Carboniferous floras of Queensland. Queensland government mining journal, 34: 37–38.

Whitehouse, F. W. (1936–1939). The Cambrian faunas of north-eastern Australia. Memoirs of the Queensland Museum, 11: 59–78, 179–182.

Whitehouse, F. W. (1940). Studies in the late geological history of Queensland. Papers of the Department of Geology, University of Queensland, 2(1): 1–74.

Whitehouse, F. W. (1942). The surface of western Queensland. Proceedings of the Royal Society of Queensland, 53: 1–22.

Whitehouse, F. W. (1944). The natural drainage of some very flat monsoonal lands. The Australian Geographer, 4: 183–196.

Whitehouse, F. W. (1946). A marine early Cretaceous fauna from Stanwell (Rockhampton district). Proceedings of the Royal Society of Queensland, 57: 7–20.

Whitehouse, F. W. (1948). The geology of the Channel country of south-western Queensland. Technical bulletin of the Bureau of Investigation Queensland, 1: 1–28.

Whitehouse, F. W. (1951). Physiography in Handbook of Queensland. Australasian Association for the Advancement of Science: 5–12.

Whitehouse, F. W. (1953). The Mesozoic environments of Queensland. Reports of the Australasian Association for the Advancement of Science, 29: 83–106.

Whitehouse, F. W. (1955). The geology of the Queensland portion of the Great Australian Artesian Basin. Appendix G in Artesian water supplies in Queensland. Department of the Co-Ordinator of General Public Works, Queensland, Parliamentary Papers A: 56–1955.

== See also ==
- Rhodes Scholarship
