= Melville Haysom =

Australian artist, sculptor, instructor and musician

- Born: Melville Roy George Haysom; August 17, 1900; Melbourne, Victoria, Australia
- Died: 1968 (aged 67–68)
- Education: National Gallery School
- Known for: Painting, sculpture
- Movement: Impressionism, abstract art, Heidelberg School
- Spouse: Yvonne Haysom
- Awards: Godfrey Rivers Bequest Award (1935)

Melville Haysom (1900-1968) was an Australian artist, sculptor, instructor and musician. He specialised in portrait, coastal and animal paintings, with evident impressionist or abstract styles. His work was held in galleries of Canberra, Sydney and Brisbane.

== Early life ==
Melville Roy George Haysom was born in Melbourne, Victoria on 17 August 1900. His parents, William and Christina Haysom encouraged him to pursue art and music studies. He studied art at the National Gallery School in Melbourne, but developed his own art style when he studied in Heidelberg School. He was also influenced by the abstract styles coming from European artworks. He became President of the Victorian Art Society in 1923.

Haysom moved to Queensland in 1929. He wrote art critiques for newspapers, worked as a musician in the orchestra of the Regent Theatre, as well as pursuing his painting career. He received the Godfrey Rivers Bequest Award in 1935 for the portrait of his wife.

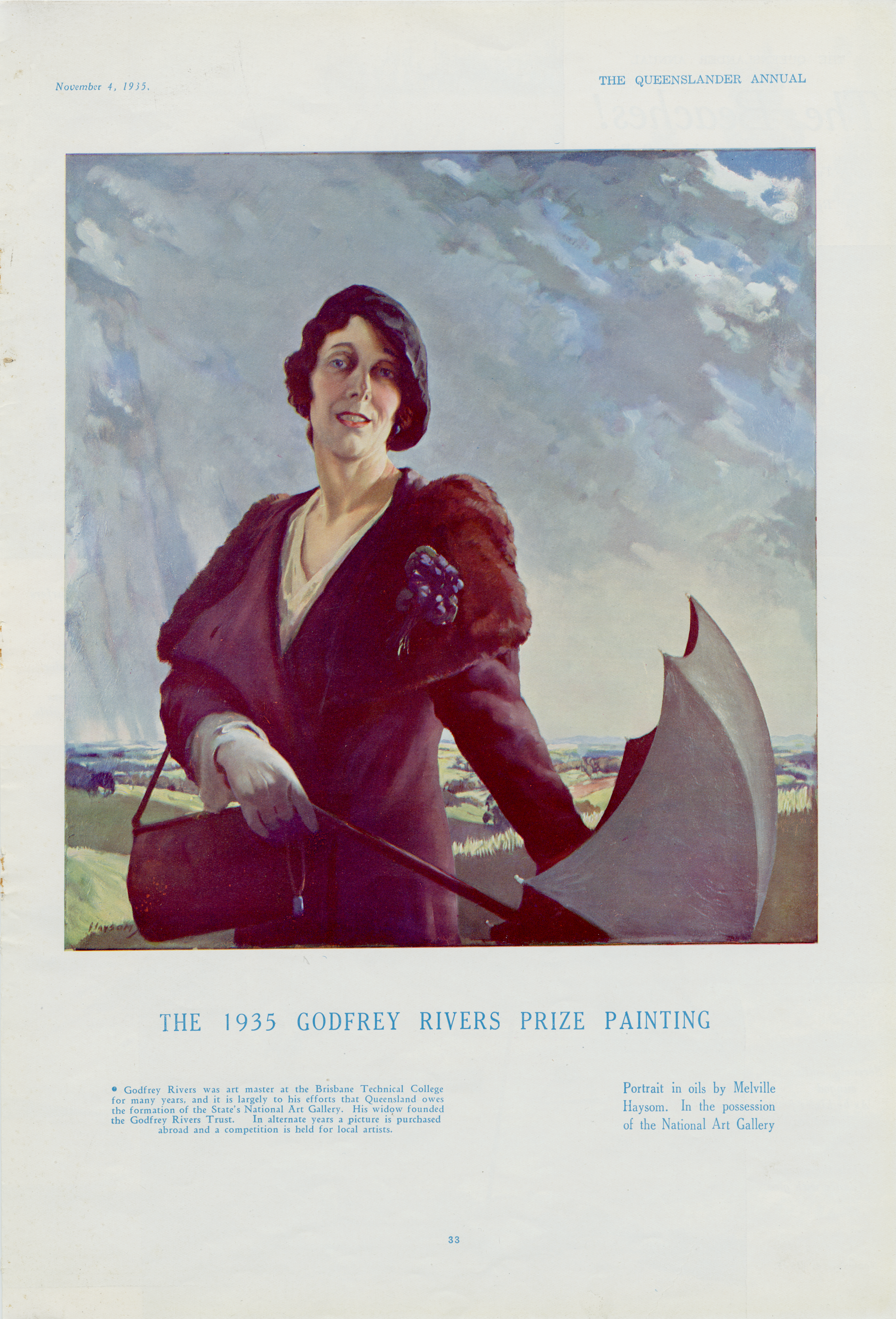
Meville Haysom wins the Godfrey Rivers Trust art prize, 1935

He was commissioned to prepare a portrait of Dr James Mayne in 1936. Murals by Haysom are on the walls of QUT Kelvin Grove and Tattersalls Club in Brisbane.

== Military service ==
Haysom volunteered in the Australian Army during World War II. Following this service, he taught art at the Brisbane Central Technical College (now QUT), providing instruction to many ex-servicemen who took advantage of the scholarships on offer after the war.

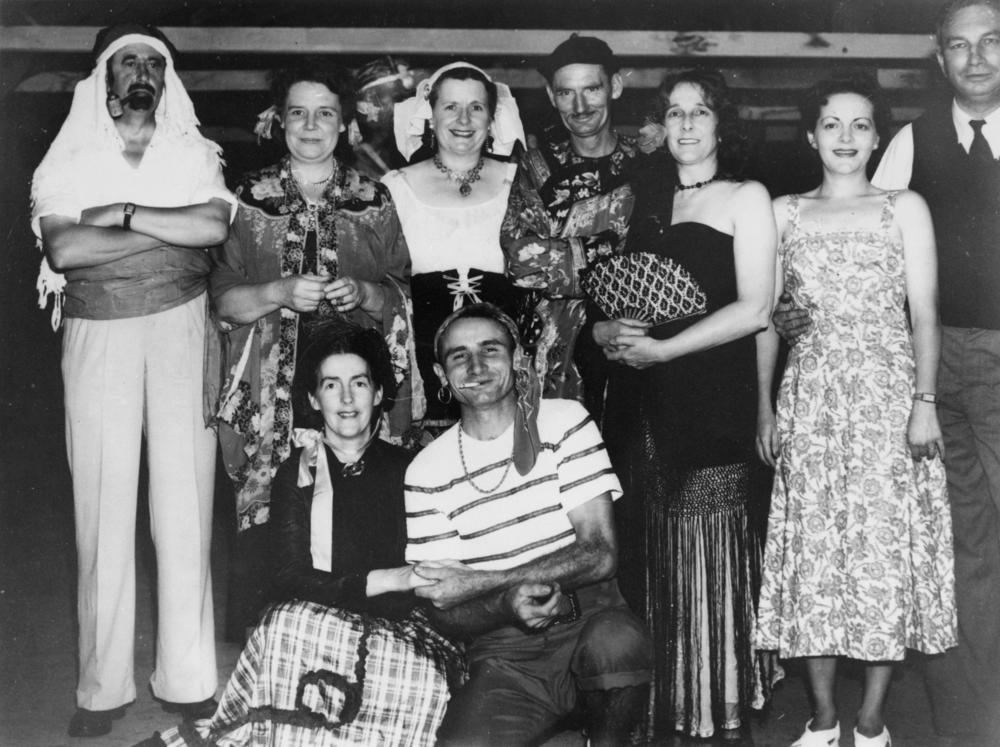
StateLibQld 1 138112 Artists' party at the home of Melville and Yvonne Haysom, 1951

He and his wife encouraged the art community in Brisbane which regularly met at their home Merri Merri farm, in the foothills of Mt Coot-tha at Chapel Hill. He was a Fellow of the Australian Artists Society and a Life Member of the Royal Queensland Art Society, in addition to being its president from 1952 to 1955. Haysom was also involved in the Scouting movement of Brisbane.

== Personal life ==
Haysom married Yvonne Denis in Melbourne in 1925. He died in Brisbane on 25 December 1968, and was survived by his wife, Yvonne and their son, Noel. Selected papers relating to his career are held by the University of Queensland Fryer Library and the State Library of Queensland. An annual memorial scholarship was awarded in his name by the Queensland Art Gallery until Yvonne's death in 2016.

His art is found in the Queensland Art Gallery, National Gallery of Australia, National Gallery of New South Wales, Griffith University Art Collection and University of Queensland Darnell Collection, as well as held privately. Two retrospectives of his work have been held since his death, in 1971 and at the Ipswich City Council Art Gallery in 1987, curated by Stephen Rainbird.
