= Regent Theatre, Brisbane =

Heritage-listed cinema in Brisbane, Queensland

Regent Theatre (Brisbane)
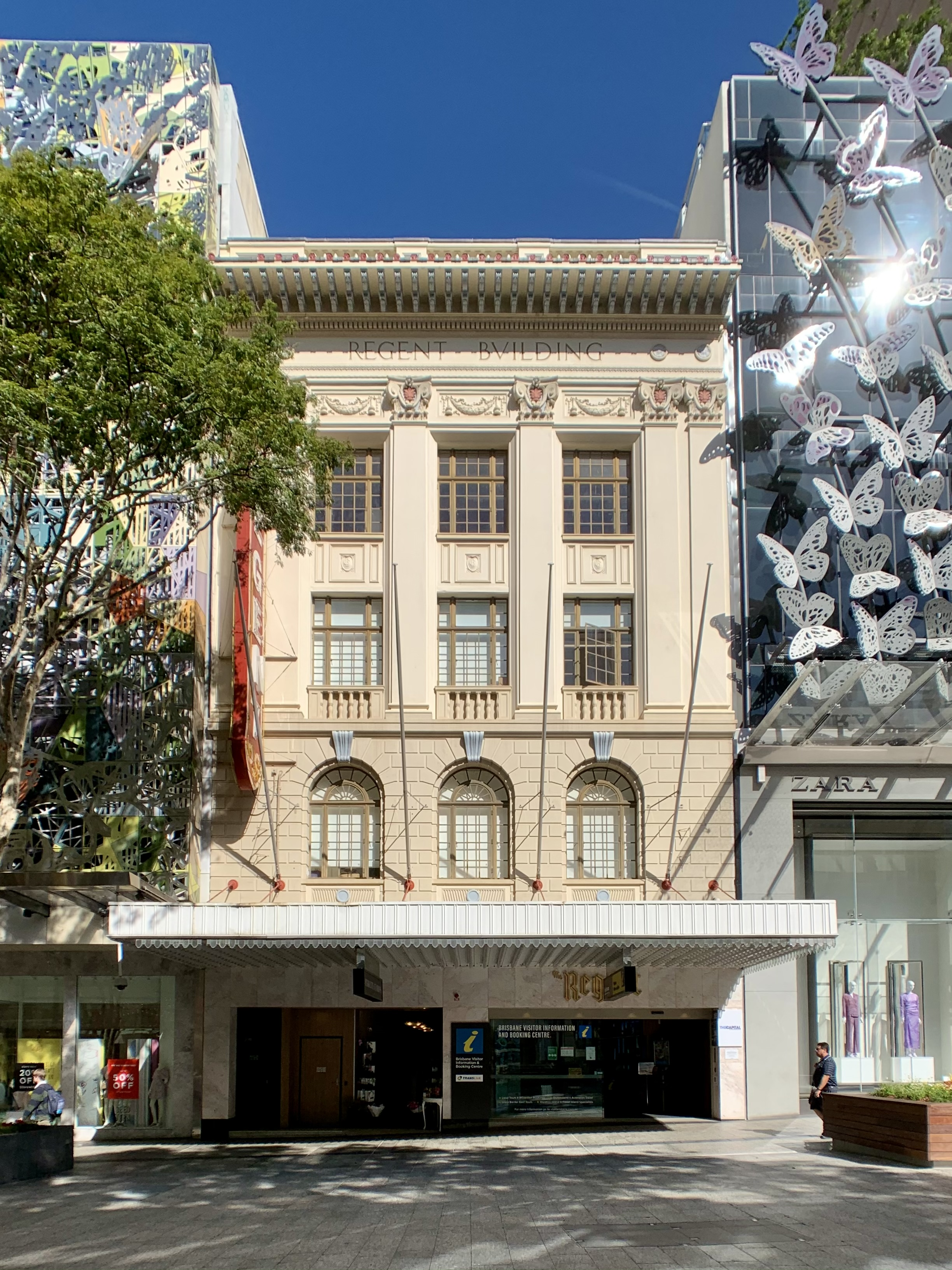
- Queen Street Mall facade, 2020

- Location within Queensland
- 27.4694°S 153.0261°E
- Location: 167 Queen Street, Brisbane, Australia

History
- Design period: 1919–1930s (interwar period)
- Built: 1928–1929

Site notes
- Architect(s): Richard Gailey, Junior, Charles N Hollinshed, Aaron Bolot
- Architectural style: Classicism

Queensland Heritage Register
- Official name: Regent Building, Regent Theatre
- Type: state heritage (built)
- Designated: 21 October 1992
- Reference no.: 600140
- Significant period: 1929 (fabric); 1929–1970s (historical); 1929–ongoing (social)
- Significant components: office/s, foyer – entrance, steps/stairway, shop/s
- Builders: J & E L Rees, A J Dickenson

The ReA J Dickenson. It was one of the original Hoyts' Picture Palaces from the 1920s. It is also known as the Regent Building. The auditorium interior was largely lost when it was converted into a four-screen complex in 1979–1980, but the building, including the surviving entrance and main foyer, was added to the Queensland Heritage Register on 21 October 1992.

== History ==
The Regent Theatre in Brisbane was constructed as the first and only American-style picture palace to be built in Queensland. It reflects the opulence and grandeur of the great Hollywood era and was one of many operated by Hoyts in Australia.

Other significant Regent Cinemas around Australia were the Regent in George Street, Sydney (now demolished), the Regent on the Rundle Mall in Adelaide which is now converted into a shopping mall and the Regent Melbourne on Collins Street, restored in the 1990s and now a major successful live theatre for Melbourne. The Regent Theatre, Dunedin in New Zealand was adapted for live performances in the 1970s and continues to be used for those and as a cinema. Smaller Regent cinemas include the Regent in downtown Ballarat, Victoria, now remodelled into a multi-screen complex.

The picture palaces were built to imitate Hollywood's Golden Era and were designed to function as a cinema and theatre. The Regent in Brisbane was designed by the Melbourne architect Charles N. Hollinshed, with assistance from the Brisbane-based Richard Gailey Junior and Aaron Bolot. It was erected in 1929 and opened on 8 November. Construction costs totalled £300,000.

The first feature presentation shown at the Regent Theatre was Fox Movietone Follies of 1929.

The Regent Building comprises part of the original Regent Theatre complex constructed on land between Queen Street and Elizabeth Street, between 1928 and 1929. It includes a basement, four levels of tenancies at 167 Queen Street, two street-level shops, and the ornately decorated entrance hall and grand foyer, which led into the original 2500-seat Regent Theatre. While the office building was completed late in 1928, and tenanted from April 1929, the theatre opened to the public in November 1929. The building was redeveloped in the late 1970s, with four cinemas installed in the space originally occupied by the 2500-seat theatre and opened in 1980 as the Hoyts Entertainment Centre. This development retained the four levels of tenancies, the basement, two street level shops, the entrance hall and grand foyer. One of the four cinemas, known as the Showcase Theatre and located on the lower level of the complex, was constructed to recall the design of the original Regent Theatre. Its vestibule was also a re-construction recalling the vestibule which had been on a mezzanine level of the original theatre. The entertainment centre was closed for further redevelopment in June 2010.

Situated in Brisbane's main thoroughfare, Queen Street, between Albert and Edward Streets, the Regent Building was located within the city's central shopping, business and entertainment precinct. It was constructed on a number of contiguous land parcels with one long, narrow lot (2/RP49279) having frontage to both Queen and Elizabeth Streets, and a number of contiguous lots facing Elizabeth Street. The shape of the allotments, determined the theatre's plan. The narrow Queen Street lot comprised the entrance hall and grand foyer, giving the theatre a prestigious Queen Street address, while the auditorium was constructed on the broad part of the site in Elizabeth Street. The Queen Street lot had been acquired in the 1850s by Patrick Mayne. Its ownership later passed into the possession of two of his children; Dr James O'Neil Mayne and Mary Emelia Mayne. The Elizabeth Street lots, where the original theatre was constructed, comprised three additional lots; one of which had also been acquired by Patrick Mayne in the 1850s (L217/B11826) and passed to his children after his death. The remaining two lots (L1/RP574 & L1/RP575) that comprised the theatre site were purchased by film director and entrepreneur J. C. Williamson in 1928 and transferred to Hoyts Theatres Ltd in June 1929. Dr James Mayne leased the Elizabeth Street allotment and part of 2/RP49279 to Capitol Theatres Ltd for 50 years from 1 December 1927, which transferred both leases to Hoyts in September 1932. After James and Mary Mayne died in 1939 and 1940 respectively, their estate was left to the University of Queensland as the sole beneficiary.

Approval to build a lavish Regent Theatre in Brisbane, which would accommodate all classes of theatrical entertainment from opera to vaudeville and films, was granted by the Brisbane City Council in 1926, at a time when "picture palaces" were gaining popularity worldwide. In central Brisbane, the Regent was to join a substantial cohort of theatres and theatre-cinemas which formed the basis of a vibrant cultural and social hub. By 1930, apart from the new Regent, Queen Street between Albert and Edward Streets housed His Majesty's (opened 1888), the Wintergarden (opened in 1924), and the Majestic (opened 1915, rebuilt as Odeon 1957). Three other venues had operated in Queen Street but were closed by 1923: the Pavilion and Strand De Luxe Theatres between the site of the Regent and Albert Street, and West's Olympia at the corner of Queen and North Quay. Nearby in Albert Street were The Tivoli (built as a theatre in 1915 and converted to a cinema in 1927), the Empire (opened 1911, renamed St James in 1933, and the Paris in 1965), and the Lyceum (1909, remodelled as the Elite in the 1920s and substantially rebuilt in 1965 as the George Twin Cinema) in George Street. Elsewhere were the Theatre Royal in Elizabeth Street (opened 1881, demolished) and Centennial Hall in Adelaide Street (opened 1888, later Coconut Grove dance hall and Guild Cafe Theatre, which closed 1949). One of the last to be constructed within the same street block as the Regent was the 1937 Metro Theatre in Albert Street. Some of these were demolished in the 1960s and by 1986 only the George Cinema and the Metro, remodelled as the Albert Cinemas, remained.

The architects responsible for the design of the 1929 Regent Theatre Building worked in association. They were Charles Neville Hollinshed, a Melbourne-based architect, and Richard Gailey Junior, a prominent Brisbane practitioner who, among other commissions, had designed the nearby Brisbane Arcade for Dr James Mayne in 1924. Hollinshed was involved with other large theatre projects, including a number in Melbourne such as the Fitzroy Regent, the Comedy Theatre and the refurbishment of Her Majesty's. Aaron Bolot, then an employee of Gailey, also worked on the project. Their designs were featured in the Architecture and Building Journal of Queensland; first in June and July 1927, later through 1928, and into 1929, where the scale and splendour of the building were amply described. The Queen Street section - occupied by April 1929 - comprised a basement, a street-facing shop, four levels of commercial tenancies, the entrance hall, and the grand foyer. It was originally to be the Capitol Building, which is why there are intertwined CBs on the front facade. The theatre was constructed on the larger Elizabeth Street site and included six shops at street level and a 200-space basement car-park, accessible from Elizabeth Street.

The brick shell of the theatre building on Elizabeth Street enclosed a composite steel and concrete frame with ancillary timber framing used to support the floors and ceilings and their decorative features. The Regent in Brisbane reflected the evolution of the picture palace concept devised by Samuel Lionel "Roxy" Rothapfel's 1913 Regent Theatre in New York which created a fantasy interior where audiences could lose themselves within an evocatively decorated atmospheric picture palace. This style was perpetuated by Hoyts in a chain of Regent theatres built across Australia in the 1920s, in Melbourne, South Yarra, Ballarat, Perth, Sydney and Adelaide. Two more were built in New Zealand in Auckland and Palmerston North. The Brisbane Regent's interiors were a blend of Gothic, Baroque and Classical themes. Two building contractors were employed on the Brisbane Regent: AJ Dickenson for the theatre component and J & EL Rees for the Queen Street section. Construction and fit-out costs, including furnishings (some of which reputedly were antiques collected from overseas), paintings, the main chandelier, Belgian carpets, a Wurlitzer organ, and a state-of-the-art air conditioning system, amounted to around £400,000.

Almost a year after the tenancies on Queen Street were completed, the Regent Theatre opened on 8 November 1929 being described as "palatial", "rich in detail" and "strikingly beautiful". Seating more than 2500 patrons it was one of the largest theatres in Australia and comprised an extensive stage with fly tower and a large movie screen and stage, modern lighting facilities, three talking machines, and a £25,000 Wurlitzer organ from New York. A large dome stretching above the stalls featured a one-ton bronze chandelier in the centre of an oval ceiling medallion set within a "sunburst" surround. The elaborate decorative plaster work was prepared by Picton Hopkins and Son Pty Ltd in Melbourne with some involvement by the local Decorative Tile Company in its installation, which also completed the marble tiling. The ornament moulds were designed and cast in Melbourne. The final plaster pieces were cast in situ in Brisbane and then fixed into place and painted. A new proprietary board product known as "Craftex" was used to replicate stone and marble on the walls. The Mollocco Brothers of Sydney created the marble work on the staircase. The furniture and artworks used throughout the building had been selected by the Managing Director of Hoyts, Frank Thring Senior, during his travels in Europe. He had been a Managing Director with JC Williamson Films Ltd before it merged in 1926 with Hoyts Pty Ltd to form Hoyts Theatres Ltd. Thring went on to make the first Australian "talkies" with his company Efftee Film Productions in 1930–31.

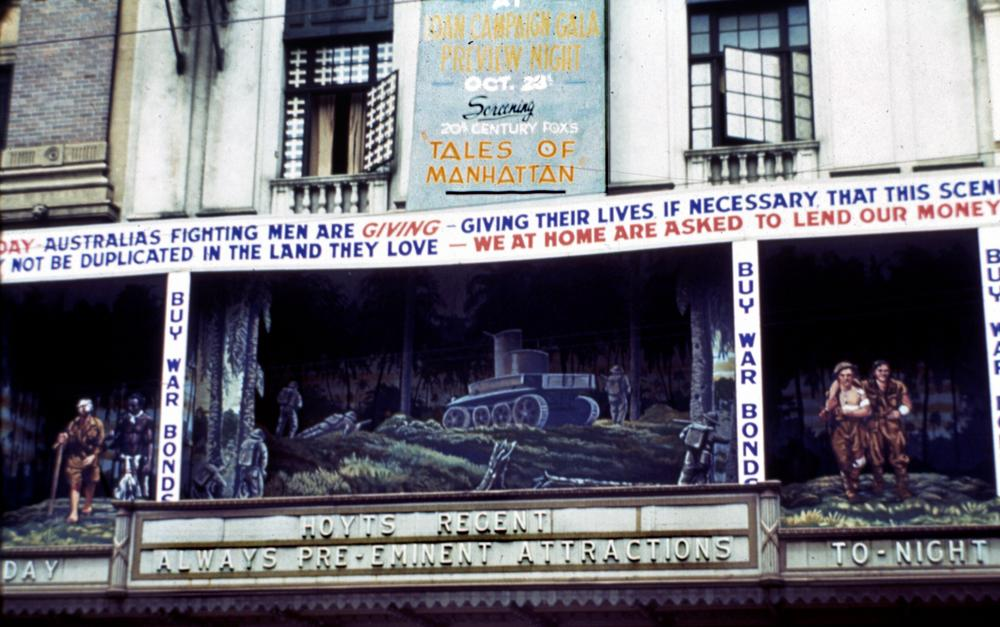
Display for war bonds on top of the Regent Theatre, 1942

The Regent tenanted office building operated successfully from April 1929, when its first tenant, a dressmaking academy was soon joined by hairdressers, estate agents, accountants, a costume designer and the Western Electric Company which provided sound reproduction equipment. A cafe was located on the ground floor facing Queen Street and in 1949 tea rooms operated on the second floor. Hoyts had offices in the basement level, which ran the entire length of the building.

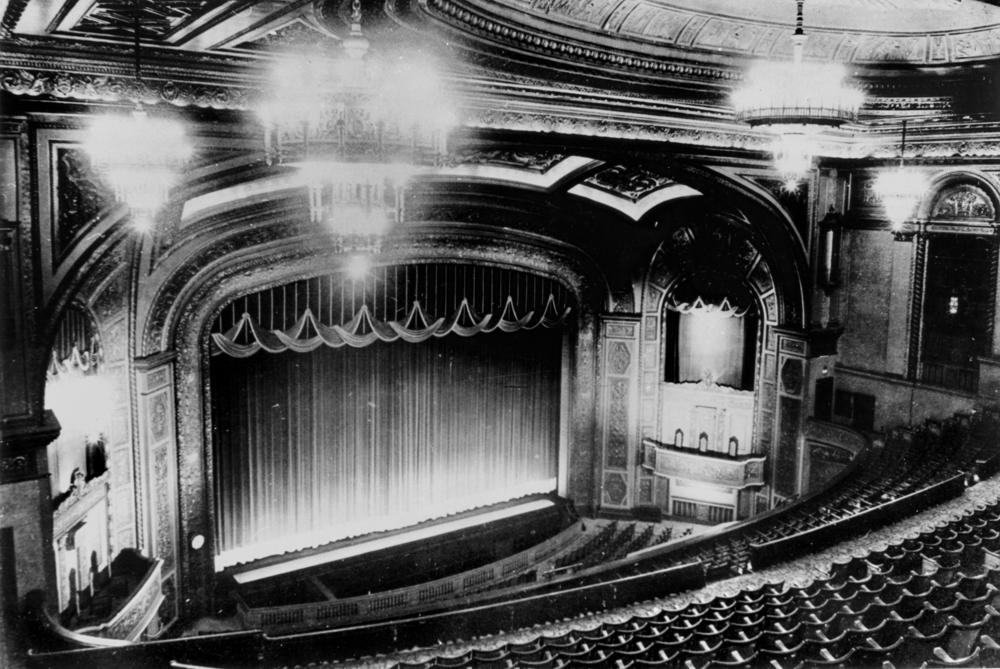
The once magnificent 2,000 seat Regent Theatre, Brisbane, ca. 1955 (now internally demolished)

The Regent, like other theatres of the time, offered a temporary escape from the harsh reality of life during the Depression. The theatre also showed newsreels, keeping audiences informed of current events, which was particularly important during World War II. The introduction of drive-in theatres from the mid 1950s and television from 1959 in Queensland were largely responsible for the decline in attendances at these large picture theatres. From the 1970s, cinema companies began constructing multiplexes to cater for smaller audience numbers watching a wider range of films.

From late 1969 Hoyts and the trustees of the Mayne Estate began devising proposals to redevelop the Regent Theatre. The manager of Hoyts Queensland revealed these plans in The Courier-Mail in January 1973 which prompted the National Trust of Queensland to investigate the historic value of the theatre and include it on the organisation's heritage list from July 1974. In view of the looming date of 1977, when the lease granted to Hoyts over the Mayne estate land would expire, it was decided that the best option for the continued generation of income was to replace the existing theatre with a number of smaller cinemas. The local architectural firm commissioned by the trustees to complete the design for this proposal was Lange L Powell, Dods and Thorpe. The National Trust made an objection to a preliminary application lodged with the Brisbane City Council and succeeded in postponing the project. In the meantime the organisation presented alternative plans, which were eventually deemed economically unviable. A final application was approved by the Brisbane City Council in June 1978 for a scheme that retained the entrance hall and grand foyer, cafe and offices but replaced the auditorium with four cinemas and a shopping arcade. An active local "Save the Regent" campaign began the following month, just after the National Heritage Commission announced that the theatre would be included on its National Register.

The final film screening in the original Regent Theatre was on 27 August 1978, demolition being planned for a few weeks later. The University of Queensland Senate tried to postpone the redevelopment while options to convert the Regent to a live theatre venue were further explored, and the Building Workers' Industrial Union imposed a Green Ban on the site from 12 September to facilitate these discussions. This was lifted on 8 December, when again no commercially viable option for retaining the theatre had been found.

Workers began demolition on Saturday 9 December 1979. Newspaper reports indicate that seven or eight young men demolished the interior with sledge hammers, axes and chain saws. Plaster on the walls was broken up, the royal boxes destroyed, and seats either kicked in or thrown from the upper windows to the ground. The plaster decoration around the screen was destroyed although the ceiling remained intact on Monday 11 December. The University Senate stated that the trustees' architects had been on site to ensure that any items required for the redevelopment were retained. Some of the interior fittings were salvaged for local cinemas such as the Majestic Theatre. The "Save the Regent" organisation complained to the Labour Relations Minister over the demolition and for breaches of the Construction Safety Act 1971, for which a prosecution was initiated in December 1979.

After some delays during construction, the $5 million redevelopment opened on 2 August 1980, being known as the Hoyts Entertainment Centre. Apart from the new, much smaller cinemas, one of which was decorated with plaster ornament either salvaged or recast from the 1929 originals, the building contained a ground level vestibule and bar adjacent to this embellished cinema that were fitted out in a similar manner. Two cinemas with their own "modern" foyer were installed on an upper level accessed via the grand staircase, and a food outlet (McDonald's) was set up in the basement. The Regent Building facing Queen Street remained intact with minor alterations and served as an entrance to the new cinema complex.

In 1992, under the Queensland Heritage Act 1992 (the act), the Hoyts Entertainment Centre was provisionally entered in the newly created Queensland Heritage Register (QHR). The heritage boundary attached to this listing encompassed all that remained of the original Regent Theatre Building, including the new cinemas within the remnant theatre shell. An objection to the inclusion of these parts was lodged the following year. As required by the act an independent assessor was appointed to investigate the objection and concluded that the building component on Elizabeth Street, where the four cinemas had been inserted, was not of significance and that this area should not be permanently entered in the heritage register. In 1994, after considering the independent assessor's report, the Heritage Council reduced the boundary to its current extent. Recent applications to enter the remnants of the 2500-seat theatre that once stood on Elizabeth Street were thoroughly investigated, but concluded that they did not meet the criteria for entry in the register.

The Regent Theatre complex continued operation in various guises until June 2010, hosting among other gala events the annual Brisbane International Film Festival (BIFF) since about 1995 and housing BIFF administration. A development is planned that encompasses the Regent, Wintergarden Shopping Centre and Hilton Hotel sites, contiguous along Queen and Elizabeth Streets. The project involves the demolition of the Regent cinema box and the four cinemas within it and construction of a commercial office tower on the site. It also involves conservation works to the heritage-listed Regent Building, including the tenanted building on Queen Street, the entrance hall and grand foyer and the integration of the latter into the new mixed-used complex.

=== The Theatre in the 70s to the 2000s ===
In 1978 the Regent was marked for demolition by Hoyts and The University of Queensland Mayne Trust, but after lobbying from the Save the Regent campaign, a partial compromise was met. The original building was saved in its entirety and only the interior decorations, mostly being plaster, were removed. A large portion of these interior decorations were later incorporated into the Regent cinemas. The marble staircase and vaulted ceilings of the entrance hall, grand foyer and mezzanine foyer were saved, complete with ceiling murals and many other plaster castings.

The four Regent cinemas were built inside the original 1929 building, as a stand-alone structure. Cinema One, later known as the showcase cinema was created using the original decorations, saved from the original theatre auditorium.

In 1992, the building was added to the Queensland Heritage Register.

The basement car park was rebuilt, housing what was for many years until 2003, the largest McDonald's restaurant in Australia.

The Regent held the honour of housing the largest screens for a cinema in Brisbane for many years, and retained its position as the most popular cinema well into the 2000s.

In 2001, Hoyts and Greater union merged, forcing Hoyts to surrender its activity on the site due to an Australian Competition & Consumer Commission ruling. The cinemas were then operated by Greater Union for a period. In 2003, the building was leased by Birch, Carroll & Coyle who refurbished cinemas three and four, giving them two separate colour schemes of blue for cinema three and red for cinema four.

When Birch, Carrol & Coyle rebuilt the Myer Centre cinema, it lost all interest in maintaining the Regent and allowed the cinemas to run into disrepair. They quickly fell out of favour, leaving the property owners to question the future viability of the site.

In 2007, the University of Queensland Mayne Trust sold the property to the Industry Superannuation Property Trust who then commissioned multinational property developer Brookfield Multiplex to redevelop it.

=== Office tower development ===
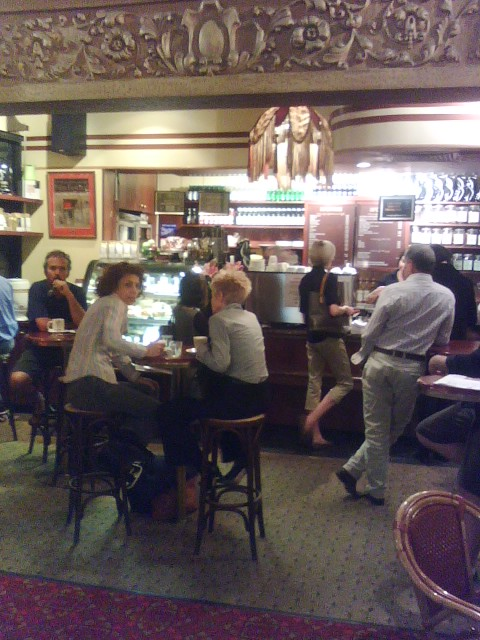
Aromas Coffee House at the Theatre Foyer, 2008

The heritage listed Regent Theatre historic facade, entry and mezzanine foyer are to be retained in a redevelopment of the site. The majority of the building was controversially demolished to make way for a forty-storey office tower and carpark. The Bligh Labor state government has been criticised for the lack of consultation and intervention regarding the decision, similar to the circumstances of the demolition of the original theatre.

Following several warnings, in March 2012 the Regent Tower developers Brookfield Multiplex, were fined by the Brisbane City Council for breaching project guidelines. This came after the revelation that historic grotesques were destroyed on the Elizabeth Street portion of the building. The controversy centred around the broken promise by the Planning Minister in the state government, Stirling Hinchliffe who said that the items would be preserved.

A new "Save The Regent" group was formed in 2008, reminiscent of the original group formed in the 1970s. The group staged a public battle to save the Regent on the grounds that it continued to perform its original function, screening motion pictures, and that much of the original fabric remained at the site. Several public protests were held including a street march to the building's Elizabeth St facade.

The battle was lost and the Regent was demolished between June 2011 and March 2012. The office tower will not have any cinemas but will contain three multifunction auditoria which can possibly be used as cinemas. These are only permitted to operate on weekends and include a new Queensland Film and Television Centre.

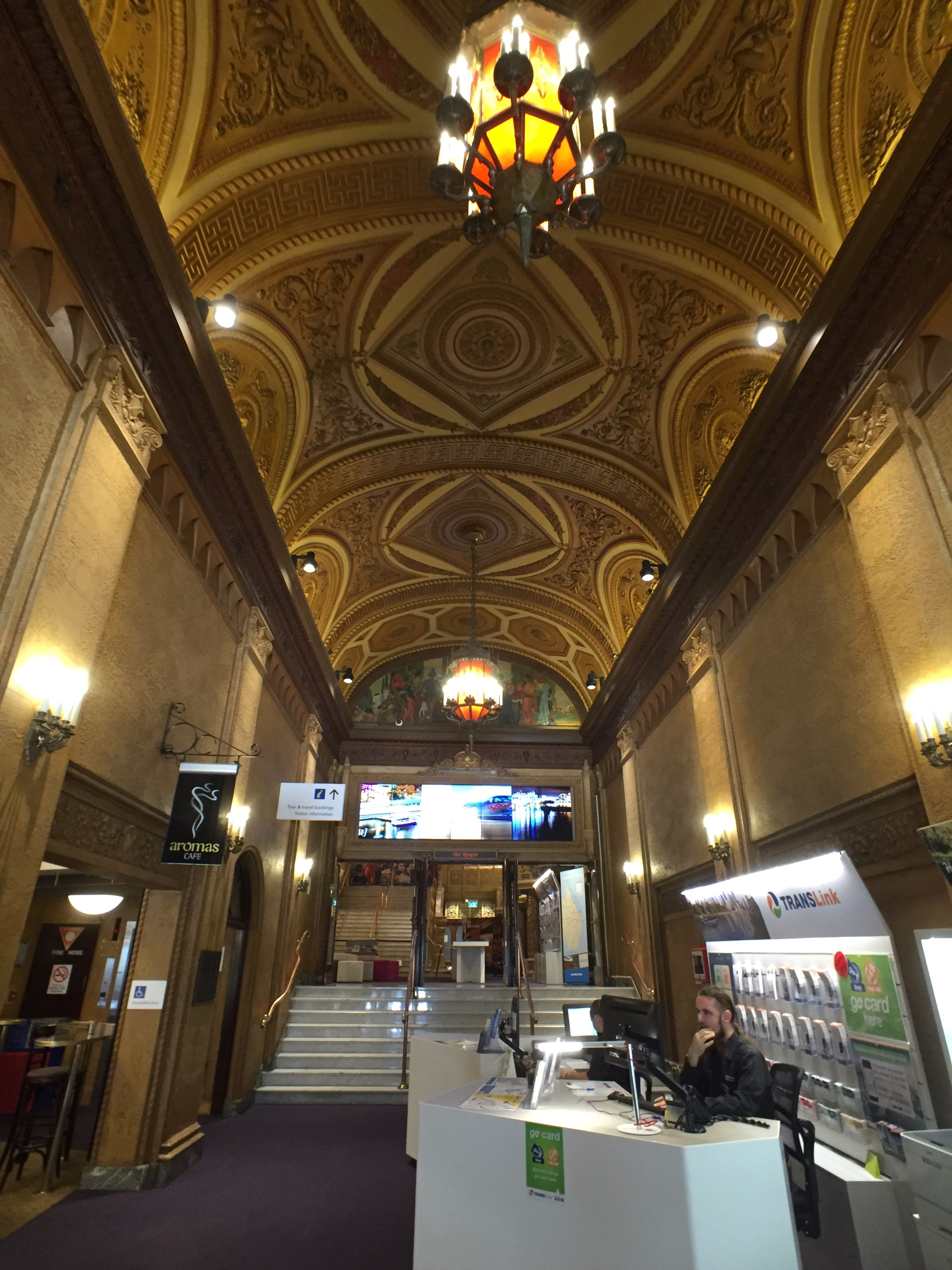
Foyer, 2016

In May 2013, Brisbane Development news site reported that the Regent Tower development was defunct. Similarly, the official regenttower.com.au website was shut down.

In November 2014 the Brisbane City Council moved the Brisbane Visitor Information Centre into the entrance hall and grand foyer of the Regent. At the opening ceremony, Regent Tower development director Chris McCluskey stated "the project would go ahead but the kind of space was still to be determined. We're going through a redesign process at the moment and looking at alternative ways to deliver that project in line with market conditions. There is significant office space in the CBD, so we are looking for the right space to suit market conditions."

As of December 2014 construction was yet to commence.

== Description ==
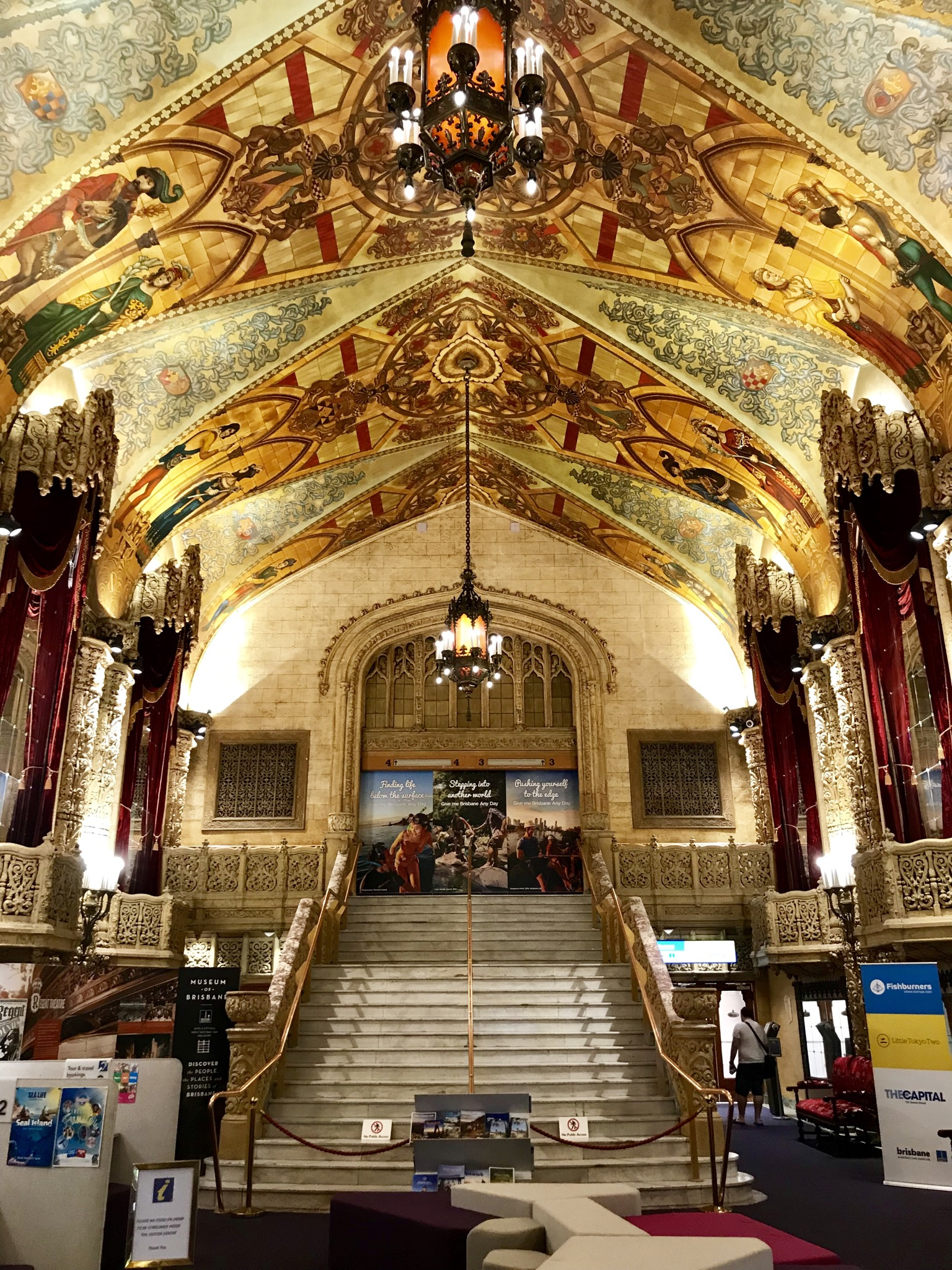
The mezzanine foyer of the Regent Theatre with its high-vaulted ceiling

The Regent Building is located at 167 Queen Street, with public access off the Queen Street Mall between Edward and Albert Streets. Within the vicinity of the Regent are the 1924 Brisbane Arcade, the 1930 National Australia Bank, the 1981 Wintergarden Shopping Centre and the 1986 Hilton Hotel. Occupying approximately half of lot 2 on RP49018 on its Queen Street side, this five-storey building is what remains intact of the original theatre complex. It contains the decorated entrance hall, an adjacent small retail tenancy and a coffee shop (spaces originally part of single tenancy) at ground level. On levels one to four above ground there are tenantable offices, while below ground there is a basement. Behind this part of the building, connected to the hall by a wide set of stairs and three double doors, is the grand foyer with its marble staircase. The heritage boundary takes in the wall, its openings and the joinery that forms the south-eastern end of this foyer.

=== Facades ===
The Queen Street facade of the Regent Building (completed late 1928) was designed using classically inspired detailing and proportions, and was described as "a Palazzo facade, imbued with an Art Deco flavour". It is symmetrical, with three window bays across and four storeys above ground level, although the fourth floor is stepped back and has no windows on this building face. The first floor features rustication in the form of scored render imitating stonework, and similarly made arched windows topped with moulded keystones and sitting on decorated panels. The second and third floors have plain, giant-order pilasters, with stylised "Composite" capitals. All windows retain their original metal frames, featuring a combination of fixed and casement windows with multiple lights. The second floor windows sit on a sill of Italianate balusters, running between the pilasters. Below the third floor windows are moulded tripartite panels featuring centred oval medallions. Inside the medallions are the entwined letters CB (standing for Capitol Building). Panels between the pilaster capitals are decorated with festoons. The frieze features paired rosettes at each end framing the name "REGENT BVILDING" lettered across its centre. An exaggerated cornice supported on closely spaced brackets projects over the frieze and is roofed with terracotta-style tiles presenting small, semi-circular profiles to the street. Topping the building is a parapet, which combines solid sections corresponding to the pilasters below and intervening open sections of Italianate balusters.

Part of the south-western (side) facade of the Regent Building is visible from the Queen Street Mall, revealing a general scheme of orange brickwork infill walls and concrete framing. The central section has a large, concrete-framed bay window, which supports a small corrugated fibro-sheeted awning with gutter. The metal windows on levels two, three and four are original, either large sets including four awning leafs each divided into four lights, or a narrow set including two pivoting leafs, one above the other, each divided into four lights. While the sills on the first two levels are concrete, those on the top are brick. The two windows at the southern end of this wall to level three are sheltered by an early hood made with light timber framing, fibro roof sheeting, guttering and flat metal sheet braces. All glass appears to be frosted with a fine wire mesh embedded in it. The opposite, north-eastern facade is not visible from the street as the Wintergarden Building has been built to that boundary.

=== Roofs ===
A combination of gable, saw-toothed and flat roof sections cover the top level of the Regent Building facing Queen Street. A large gable and skillion clad in ribbed metal roof sheeting sits over the grand foyer. (Aerial information suggests the roofing cladding of the front section of the building is also ribbed metal.)

At street level, the Regent Building frontage is divided in two, with access to the entrance hall on the right hand side and a small retail tenancy on the left. The facade under the awning is largely clad in marble with a strip of modern signage running as a frieze above the doorways. The awning cantilevers over the Queen Street Mall by approximately three metres with metal tie rods providing support from above. Otherwise clad in metal roof sheeting, the underside to the awning features contoured metal-sheet housing for numerous rows of light bulbs. Several recent illuminated signs hang from here. An ornamental leadlight fringe runs along the south-west and north-west edges of the awning. Dating from the heyday of the theatre, this decoration, aside from other features of the awning, is considered to be of heritage significance.

=== Ground floor interiors ===
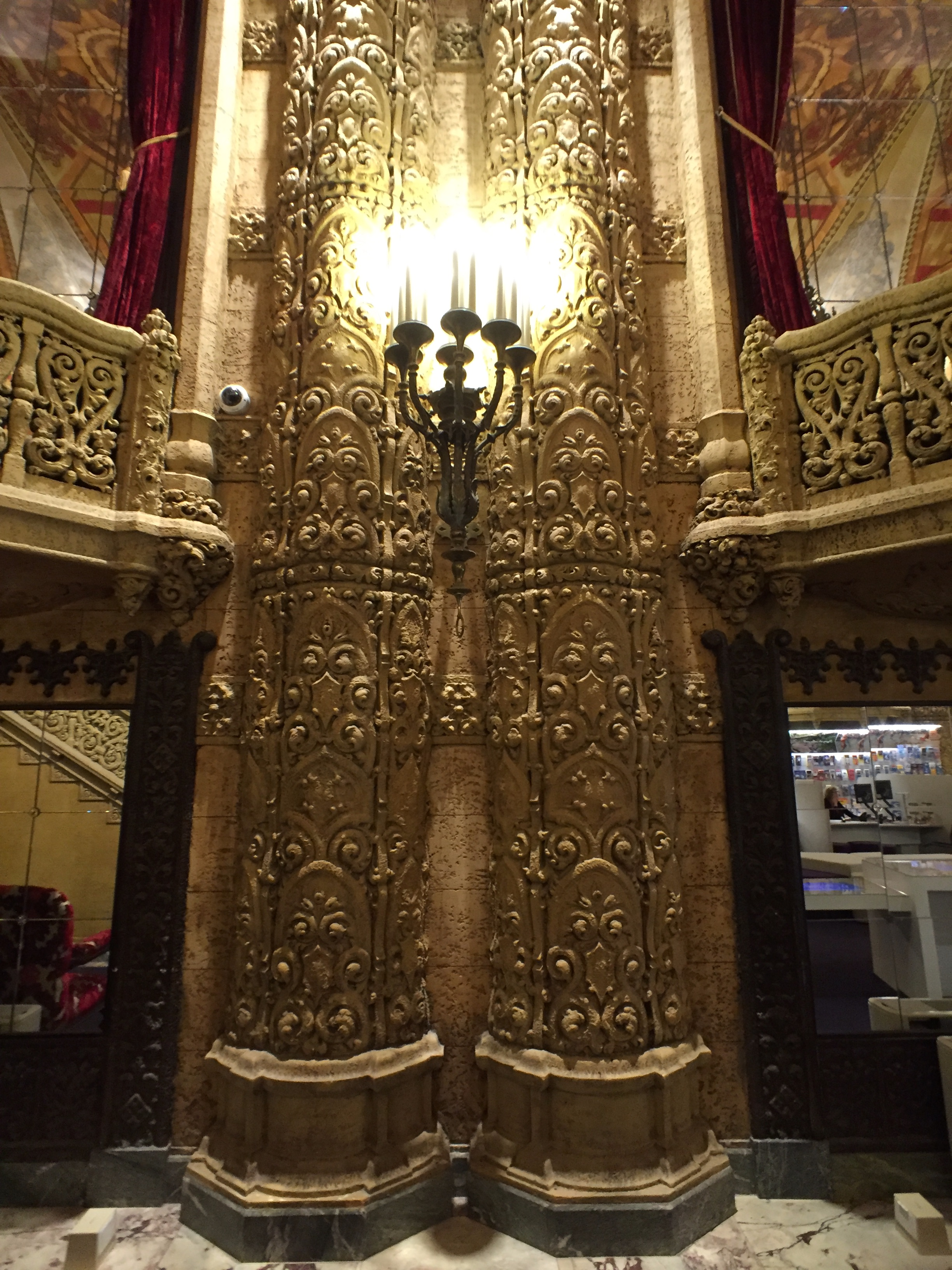
Columns in the foyer, 2016

Entering from the Queen Street Mall, the components of the building that served the Regent Theatre are: the single-height threshold space off the street; the large, double-height entrance hall; and beyond this the elaborate grand foyer, which retains the marble staircase that once led to the 1929 theatre's mezzanine promenade. The interiors of all these spaces are ornamented in a confection of styles, which include Art Deco, Spanish Gothic, Baroque and Neo-classical or Empire. A key strategy employed in the design of picture palaces of this era, these styles are freely used to create eclectic visual effects without concern for historical or stylistic accuracy. These spaces form an sequence, retaining coherence despite the mixture of decorative styles.

The threshold space between the Queen Street Mall and the entrance hall is single-height, approximately six metres wide and four-and-a-half metres deep. It has a patterned terrazzo floor, marble skirting, a large, classically styled cornice and a central ceiling rose with round light fitting. An alcove on one side features decorative plasterwork in a classical style around its border, as does the lintel forming the opening between it and the entrance hall. Recent features such as signage and television screens are not of cultural heritage significance.

The entrance hall is a long, high-ceilinged space that acts as a thoroughfare between the Queen Street Mall, the coffee shop, the upper-level tenancies and the grand foyer. After passing through the threshold space, there is a ticket booth immediately on the right hand side (possibly containing elements from the original ticket booth in the grand foyer beyond). It is approximately eight metres long and has a waist-height marble counter with an attached metal screen that extends to above head height on two sides.

The coffee shop has recent fittings and furnishings, although sections of the Art Deco-style cornice here appear to be original fabric. Closest to the street are two simple rectangular openings, while the opening closest to the grand foyer has a timber frame and semi-circular fanlight with frosted glass lights. Two openings nearest the Mall have been in-filled during the 1979–1980 renovation. The lift and main staircase to the upper floors of the Regent Building are accessed through the rear of the coffee shop and sit in the eastern corner of this part of the building. At the far end of the entrance hall, a set of marble steps spanning its full width lead up to a landing enclosed by three sets of original double doors opening into the grand foyer. Two handrails made of copper with brass divide the stair into three. The double doors are made from timber and have full-height glass lights and chrome fittings. The threshold is polished granite.

=== Entrance hall ===
The dominant feature of the entrance hall is its high barrel-vaulted ceiling decorated with Neo-classical Empire-style plasterwork and murals. The decorative pattern consists of raised, geometric shapes and festoons painted bronze, set on a pale background and divided by strips of fretwork. The end vaults are painted with colourful medieval scenes. Two elaborate original chandeliers, with red glass panels and faux candle lights are suspended from the centre of two ceiling medallions. There is an elaborate cornice and the walls resemble courses of travertine block work. Shallow pilasters divide the long walls, with a decorative frieze of small pointed arches running between them. Another frieze line sits further down the wall sections at door head height. Brass candelabras are attached to each pilaster in line with these lower friezes. Above the door openings at either end of the hall are fixed large billboards with ornamental plaster frames surmounted by crowns. The floor is carpeted and has a marble skirting, but the original patterned terrazzo floor, similar to that in the threshold space, is believed to survive beneath the carpet.

=== Grand foyer ===
The grand foyer is an impressive single volume with richly ornamented walls and ceiling; predominantly Spanish Gothic with Baroque effects, such as the use of Rococo plasterwork and large mirrored surfaces. It is approximately 22 metres (72 ft) long, 12 metres (39 ft) wide and three-and-a-half storeys high. The doors leading from the entrance hall open into the western corner of the space. To the left stands a recent ticket and snacks counter which, along with various signage, is not considered to be of cultural heritage significance. Centrally placed along the south-eastern wall, and leading up to a mezzanine level, is the grand marble staircase. On either side of it, at ground level, are double doors that lead into spaces outside of the heritage boundary.

The ceiling in the grand foyer is vaulted with deep groins that continue down the walls to form alcoves for a series of blind balconies. The entire surface area is painted with medieval-themed figures and patterns. The colour scheme relies on warm colours (predominantly reds, browns, greens and cream) given a yellow cast by the muted lighting. The groined sections of the ceiling are painted in a pattern of twisted vines with a small shield in the centre. The edge between the groined and arched surfaces is defined by a narrow red strip patterned with yellow quatrefoils. On the lowest part of the arched panels various figures in medieval costume are depicted; each standing under the archway of a colonnade, some with shields between them. Moving up towards the centre of the ceiling, another shield, flanked by lions, hovers above the colonnade arches. Spanning the ceiling centre line are three large patterned circles featuring central sunbursts. Hanging from the centre of these are two large lanterns, similar to those featured in the entrance hall.

All four walls of the grand foyer are heavily ornamented, most of which follows a dense pattern of thick, vine-like swirls and leaves that are painted mottled cream, beige and pale grey. The pale colour of this encrusted plasterwork and the extensiveness of its use within the foyer (in combination with other elements such as mirrors), are the key reasons for the design style being described as Rococo.

The long side walls are each punctuated by four blind balconies, set into the alcoves formed by the elongated ceiling groins. These balcony alcoves have low plasterwork balustrades at their base, tall mirrored panels on the flat wall behind and are capped by elaborate plasterwork canopies, from which red velvet curtains with a gold tasselled fringe are suspended. Below each blind balcony are mirrored panels with a darkly painted plaster border. Between them, from floor level to just below the ceiling, are paired, rounded pilasters encrusted with tracery. Single columns sit between the end balconies and the wall corners. Brass candelabra are fixed between each balcony at balustrade height and concealed lights at the top of the pilasters shine up onto the arched, painted ceiling.

Dominating the north-western end wall of the foyer is a large false Gothic window, made from plaster with panels of reflective bronze paint imitating glass. This feature is repeated on the opposite wall, with the lower portion serving as the doorway at the top of the grand marble staircase. Decorative friezes run across the north-western end wall at above door height, and two small lanterns are attached on either side of its Gothic window. All other wall surfaces throughout the grand foyer are scored and painted to resemble travertine block work.

A key element in the grand foyer is its staircase, which at approximately five metres wide and nine metres long was built on a scale to suit that of the large space it occupies, as well as to accommodate the numbers of patrons of the former 1929 theatre. It is clad in white marble with grey veins, and its bottom few steps swell out in a shallow curve, flanked on either side by ornate, plaster balustrade end posts that are topped with vessels for displaying flowers. The remainder of the balustrade on either side is made from plaster employing the same style of ornamentation as the walls, with the top surface of the upper rail covered in maroon and white marble and the bottom skirting made of grey-blue and white marble. A copper and brass handrail, similar to the one in the entrance hall, runs up the centre of the staircase. A landing divides the stairs in two, in line with the height of the balconies along the side walls. Both this landing and the one at the top of the stairs are finished with square marble tiles. The end posts at the top of the stairs are simple, square plinths with a marble top and additional plaster flower bowls. The upper landing extends the width of the hall to form a narrow balcony, around which the balustrade of the staircase continues. Square plasterwork panels set into the end wall at this level conceal air-conditioning ducts.

The doors leading out of the grand foyer into adjoining spaces on the ground floor match those connecting the foyer and entrance hall. In front of these doors, the wide soffit to the balcony above is decorated with a distinctive pattern of swirls interlocking to form a series of circles and has a circular light fitting in its centre. Beneath the grand marble staircase, accessed through openings on either side, there is a storeroom which retains an original timber door featuring a simple geometric pattern of ribs. Next to this storeroom are stairs that lead down to the basement (currently not in use), which retain original handrails and brackets.

Marble skirtings feature throughout the grand foyer, including around the base of the staircase. The floor at ground level is covered in recent carpet, as is the upper landing area on either side of the grand staircase.

=== Basement ===
The basement comprises a number of bare rooms stripped of wall, ceiling and floor linings and services after c. 2000 when the last tenants quit the space. The basement section of the stairwell closest to Queen Street has been sealed off, while access is still open from the stairs under the marble staircase in the grand foyer.

=== Levels one to four tenancies ===
Of the four levels of tenancies located above the ground floor of the Regent Building, the first three share an original general floor plan, consisting of a central, straight hallway linking various rooms to the lift and stairwell at its southern end. Rooms line this corridor along its length to the south-west and at the Queen Street end of the building, while staircases, toilets and other service spaces occupy the north-eastern side. The 1928 stair winds around a generously scaled void and has a wrought iron balustrade with a timber handrail moulded in a single length. While remaining in its original location next to the 1928 stair, the lift itself is not original. Further along the north-eastern side of the building there is a narrow light well, with toilets between it and the central hallway, and a fire escape staircase at its Queen Street end, which was installed during the building's 1978–80 redevelopment. The toilets occupy their original positions in the building but have been renovated since being first installed there. The windows looking into the light well, apart from those to the main stairwell (metal-framed), have been removed and the openings filled in. Kitchenettes and services cupboards sit between the 1979 fire escape and the central hallway.

A number of features found on level one are of note. The first is a theatrette overlooking Queen Street. It has a small section of tiered seating and a bio box, and is decorated with curtains covering most walls and a number of brass candelabra similar to those found elsewhere in the building and likely to be from the original 1929 fit-out of the Regent Building. There are also sections of cornice matching those present in the cafe downstairs. The second feature is two interwar timber doors with frosted glass upper lights along the south-western side of the corridor on this floor. These open to reveal the ceiling framing above the entrance hall. Further to these are pieces of original architrave, skirting boards and several plaster corbels.

On all four of these floors, original parquetry remains under the carpet. It is exposed in the central corridor of level three and its reception area. Suspended ceilings have been installed on these levels, as well as some recent studwork and plasterboard partitioning.

The top level (four) sits under a sawtooth roof at the front and two concealed gables at the rear. It is more open plan than the tenantable levels below, however its service spaces around the light well correspond to those below and a central hallway is delineated by columns. Aside from its windows on the south-eastern and south-western walls, there are clerestory windows oriented to Queen Street. A bulkhead disguising ducted air-conditioning has been installed over the central corridor space and in the toilets. Most wall and ceiling linings appear to be recent.

== Heritage listing ==
Regent Building was listed on the Queensland Heritage Register on 21 October 1992 having satisfied the following criteria.

The place is important in demonstrating the evolution or pattern of Queensland's history.

Opened in 1929, the location of the Regent Building in Queen Street demonstrates the development of this street as a cultural centre from the 1920s.

The place demonstrates rare, uncommon or endangered aspects of Queensland's cultural heritage.

The Regent Building is characteristic of a 1920s picture palace, and is one of only four Hoyts/Regent picture palaces constructed in Australia at this time.

The place is important in demonstrating the principal characteristics of a particular class of cultural places.

The Regent Building is characteristic of a 1920s picture palace, and is one of only four Hoyts/Regent picture palaces constructed in Australia at this time.

The place is important because of its aesthetic significance.

The Regent Building is valued by the community, and the ornate interior of the entry foyer has aesthetic quality.

The place has a strong or special association with a particular community or cultural group for social, cultural or spiritual reasons.

The Regent Building is valued by the community, and the ornate interior of the entry foyer has aesthetic quality.

== See also ==
- Cinema of Australia
