= Brisbane Arcade =

Heritage-listed shopping center in Brisbane, Queensland

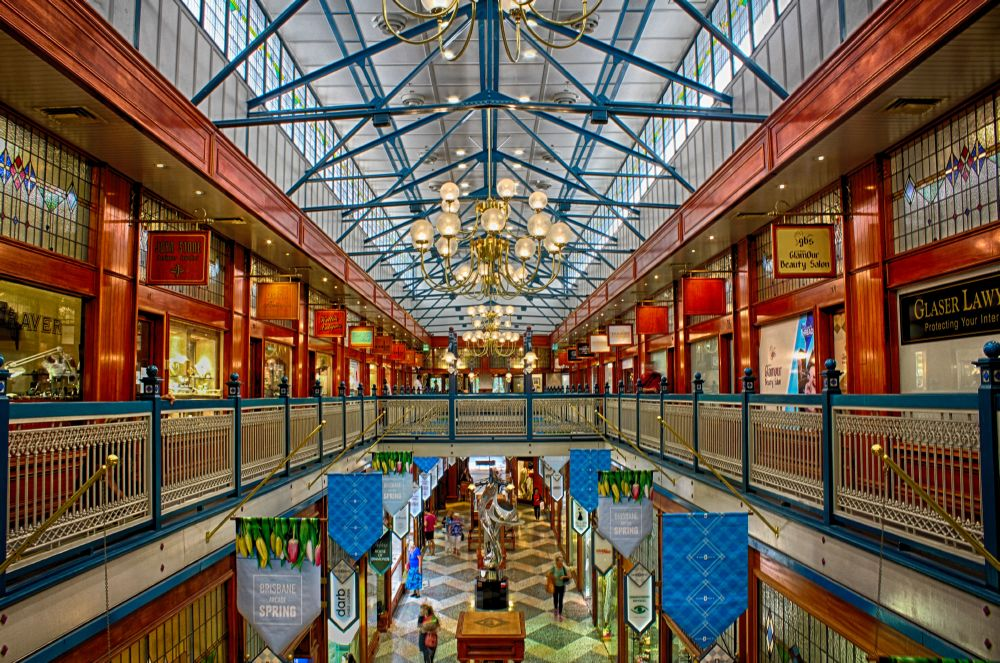
- The Brisbane Arcade viewed from its gallery level in 2016

- Location within Queensland
- 27.4689°S 153.0253°E
- Location: 160 Queen Street, Brisbane City, City of Brisbane, Queensland, Australia

History
- Design period: 1919–1930s (interwar period)
- Built: 1923–1924

Site notes
- Architect: Richard Gailey, Junior
- Architectural style: Classicism

Queensland Heritage Register
- Official name: Brisbane Arcade
- Type: state heritage (built)
- Designated: 21 October 1992
- Reference no.: 600058
- Significant period: 1924 (fabric)
- Significant components: gallery, shop/s
- Builders: J & E L Rees, Forsyth & Speering

Brisbane Arcade is a heritage-listed shopping arcade at 160 Queen Street through to Adelaide Street in the Brisbane CBD, City of Brisbane, Queensland, Australia. Designed by Richard Gailey Jr. and constructed by J & E L Rees and Forsyth & Speering from 1923 to 1924, the arcade opened on April 16, 1924. It is the oldest and grandest shopping arcade in Brisbane. It was added to the Queensland Heritage Register on 21 October 1992.

== History ==
The Brisbane Arcade was opened in March 1924. It was built for a cost of £70,000 for Dr James Mayne, and his sister Mary Emelia Mayne. Their father, Patrick Mayne, had purchased the property as two adjoining allotments in 1853 (allotment 2 of section 10, with a frontage to Queen Street) and 1854 (allotment 17 of section 10, with a frontage to Adelaide Street).

The arcade was designed by Richard Gailey Jnr (the son of architect Richard Gailey) and built by J & E L Rees (Queen Street section), & Forsyth and Speering (Adelaide Street section). It provided a pedestrian and commercial link between Queen and Adelaide Streets. The arcade contained shops with frontages to Adelaide and Queen Streets, 20 shops on the ground level of the arcade, and a further 20 on the first floor. The building also contained office accommodation on the first level. The Arcade was one of a number of building projects in Queen Street during the 1920s including Ascot Chambers (1924), Tattersalls Club (1925) and the Regent Theatre (1928).

Although there does not appear to have been an official opening ceremony, in the first week of March 1924 a number of tenants announced the opening of their arcade stores full of luxury items, such as silks, ladies' fashion and floral art.

Since the deaths of James Mayne in 1939, and Mary Mayne in 1940, Brisbane Arcade has been operated by a board of trustees acting on behalf of their estates, with operating proceeds benefiting the University of Queensland School of Medicine (now known as the University of Queensland Mayne Medical School in honour of the bequest). McGees Property manages the arcade on behalf of the board of trustees.

On 5 February 1952, the Johnstone Gallery was opened in a former bomb shelter under Brisbane Arcade, where it remained until closing on 19 December 1957 in order to relocate to Bowen Hills.

== Description ==
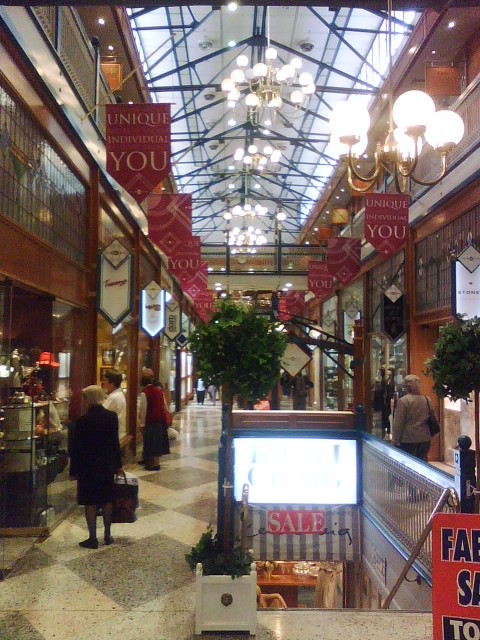
Inside the Brisbane Arcade, 2015

The Brisbane Arcade connects Queen and Adelaide Streets in the block between Edward and Albert Streets. The facades at each end have similar features - both are three storeys high and five window bays across, of face brickwork with cement dressings, and use plain Classical details.

The Queen Street facade has triangular Classical pediments at parapet level above each end window bay. These end bays are separated by flanking brick pilasters and have cantilevered balconies on both levels with wrought iron railings consisting of vertical balustrading. The openings contain timber framed multi-paned windows and french doors which open onto the balconies. Ornate floral mouldings are situated on the pilasters to either side of the upper level openings. A deep bracketed cornice runs between the base of the pediments separating the parapet from the remainder of the facade. The parapet has raised sections at each end and in the centre where there is the name "BRISBANE ARCADE" in raised lettering.

The Adelaide Street facade has a similar arrangement of openings, but has arched windows in the end bays of the top floor with keystones that extend to the cornice line. A similar cornice occurs above all the other window openings as sun hoods. Cantilevered balconies occur only on the first floor level at each end and in the centre. These have wrought iron railings with diagonal balustrading.

The entry to the arcade is central on both facades. The three storey sections extend only part of the distance into the block from both ends and are linked by the two storey arcade. Some of the ground floor shops have been changed from the traditional materials polished timber shopfronts and lead-light windows to be replaced by marble and other modern products.

The central space has a void running the length of the arcade crossed by a central walkway leading to the galleries on each side. The upper level is accessed by stairs at each end which retain their original terrazzo finishes. The roof structure above the arcade consists of lightweight exposed steel trusses, and natural light is allowed into the space through clerestory windows on each side.

The arcade features art work from the hosting of Brisbane's World Expo '88, namely, "Mirage" by Swiss-Israeli artist Gidon Graetz.

For the 95th Anniversary in 2019, Brisbane Arcade hosted a Spring Flower Show.

Today the Brisbane Arcade features a range of artisan and boutique stores, with several fashion, jewellery and specialist businesses operating out of the location.

== Heritage listing ==
Brisbane Arcade was listed on the Queensland Heritage Register on 21 October 1992 having satisfied the following criteria.

The place is important in demonstrating the evolution or pattern of Queensland's history.

The Brisbane Arcade is important in demonstrating the principal characteristics of a 1920s purpose-built shopping arcade in the central business district of Brisbane.

The Brisbane Arcade is important in exhibiting a range of aesthetic characteristics valued by the Brisbane community and those interested in retail design, in particular the quality of its design, use of materials and craftsmanship displayed in the main internal space and street facades its contribution to the central business district townscape, and the Queen Street and Adelaide Street streetscapes.

The place is important in demonstrating the principal characteristics of a particular class of cultural places.

The Brisbane Arcade is important in demonstrating the principal characteristics of a 1920s purpose-built shopping arcade in the central business district of Brisbane.

The place is important because of its aesthetic significance.

The Brisbane Arcade is important in exhibiting a range of aesthetic characteristics valued by the Brisbane community and those interested in retail design, in particular the quality of its design, use of materials and craftsmanship displayed in the main internal space and street facades its contribution to the central business district townscape, and the Queen Street and Adelaide Street streetscapes.

== Gallery ==
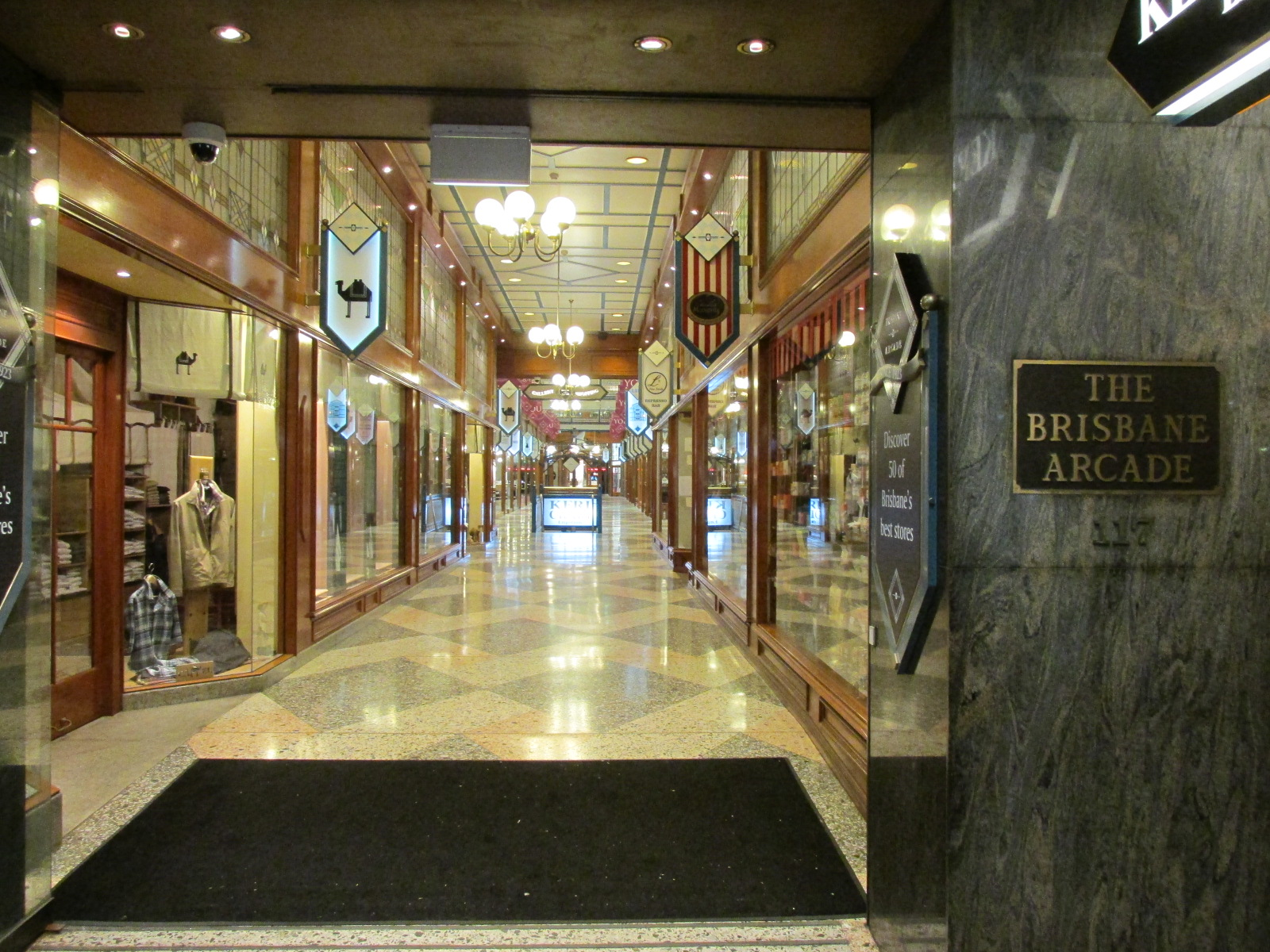
Entering the arcade, 2014

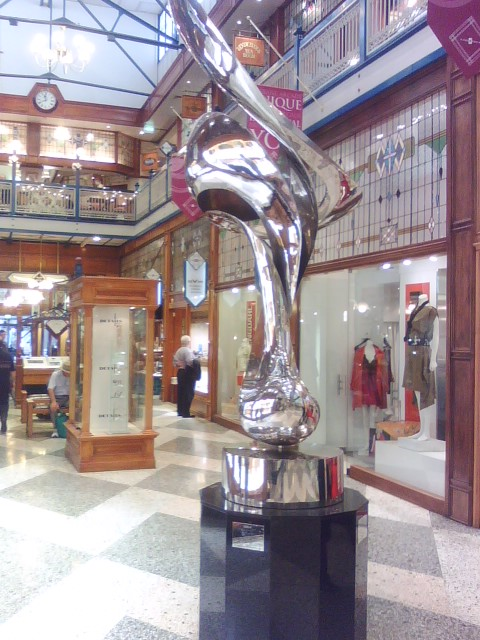
Gidon Graetz' work 'Mirage' at the centre of the Arcade, 2008

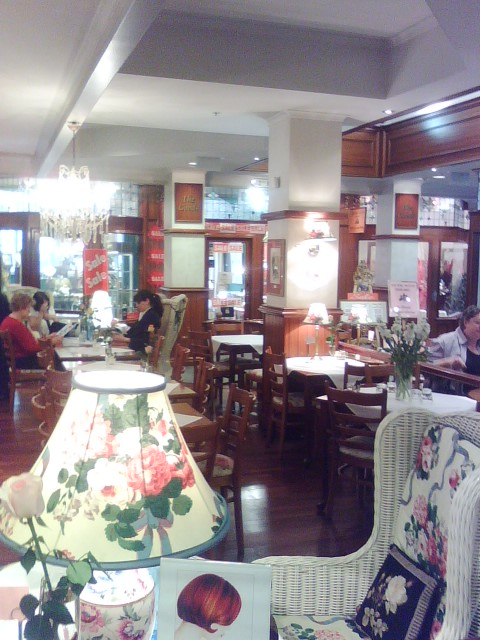
Roses Cafe at the Gallery level of the Arcade, 2008

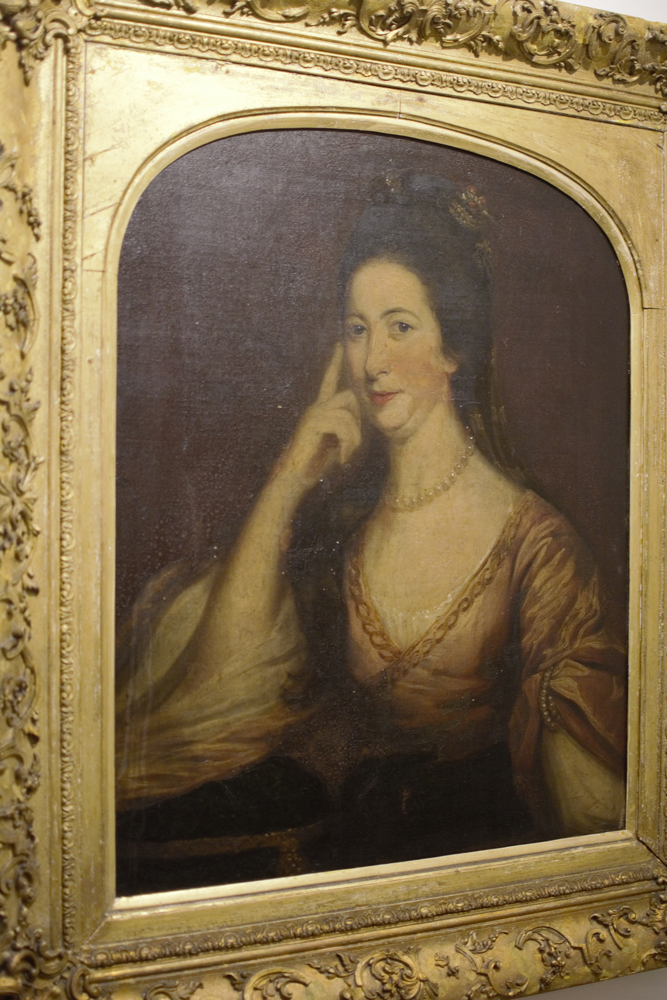
Eleanora Brisbane at Room with Roses, Brisbane Arcade, 2016
