= Majestic Theatre, Pomona =

Majestic Theatre
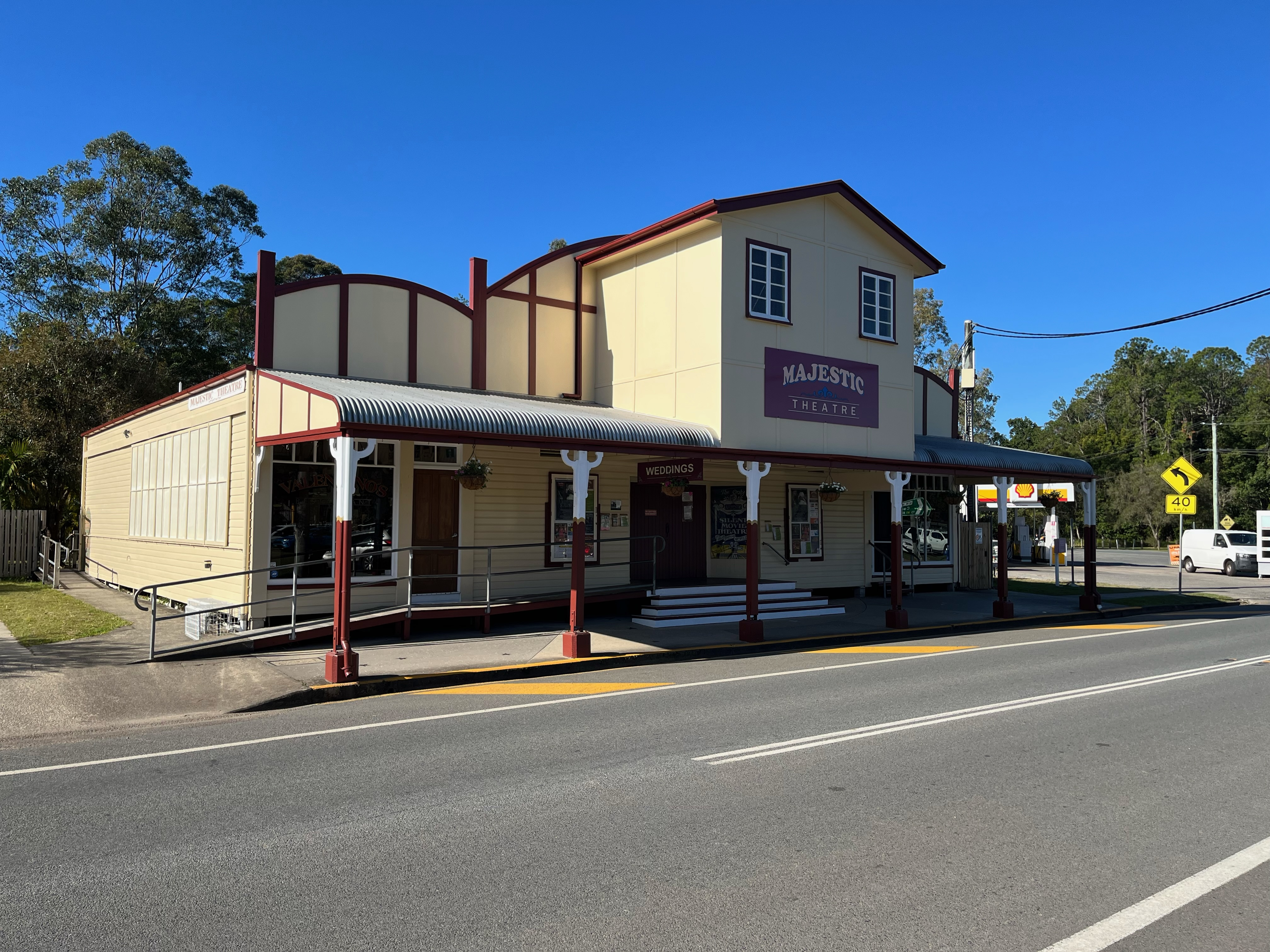
- Majestic Theatre, 2023

- Location within Queensland Location within Australia
- 26.3655°S 152.8576°E
- Location: 3 Factory Street, Pomona, Shire of Noosa, Queensland, Australia

History
- Built: 1921

Queensland Heritage Register
- Official name: Majestic Theatre
- Type: state heritage (built)
- Designated: 5 February 2009
- Reference no.: 602696
- Significant period: 1920s

Majestic Theatre is a heritage-listed theatre at 3 Factory Street, Pomona, Shire of Noosa, Queensland, Australia. It was added to the Queensland Heritage Register on 5 February 2009.

== History ==
The Majestic Theatre at 3 Factory Street Pomona, which was originally built as a social hall with attached shops in 1921, has been promoted as the oldest authentic silent movie theatre in the world, and the longest continuously operating movie theatre in Australia. Although the building's fabric was extensively refurbished recently, the timber and fibrous cement sheeted building is still a rare, and functional, example of a pre-World War II country hall that was converted into a picture theatre.

By the 1860s timber getting was the main local industry in the Pomona area. The Co-Operative Communities Land Settlement Act 1893 led to two experimental farming communes being established in the Noosa Shire, and although the Protestant Unity Group near Pomona only lasted from 1894 to 1896, some of the group's settlers stayed on the land as individual selectors. The North Coast railway line from Brisbane to Gympie was completed in 1891, and the bend where local settlers hailed the train to send their goods to market was called the Cooroora railway siding, after the nearby mountain. The name was later changed to the Pinbarren siding, but when a town was surveyed in 1900, the name of Pomona, the Roman Goddess of fruit, was chosen. The Pomona Hotel was licensed in 1906, west of the railway line, and this was followed by the Railway Hotel in 1911, east of the railway line on today's Factory Street. Noosa Shire was created in 1910, and the Shire Council office was based in Pomona until 1980.

In the first decade of the 20th century, industry in the area shifted from timber to dairying and horticulture as land was cleared. Until the establishment of a butter factory at Kin Kin in 1914, cream was sent by road to Cooran, and then by rail to Gympie's butter factory, established in 1898. Butter factories were also opened at Cooroy in 1915 and at Pomona in 1919. Bananas were also an important industry in the Shire after 1908, booming in the 1920s before declining in the early 1930s. Dairying remained as the main industry in the Noosa Shire from the 1930s until its decline in the 1960s. By the 1990s, Pomona was relying on fruit, and furniture manufacture for its livelihood.

Errol and Myra Osborne became licensees of the Railway Hotel in 1921, and that year they decided to build a hall to the south of the hotel to augment their facilities, and to attract commercial travellers, who needed space to display their wares. The land on which the Majestic Theatre stands was purchased in January 1921 by Myra Osborne's mother, Clara McDonald, who also financed the building of the hall. In August 1921 Errol Osborne supplied plans for the hall to the Noosa Shire Council, and in October 1921 R. McTackett requested permission to erect an awning in front of the hall he was erecting. In December 1921 Mrs McDonald requested that the Council make up a footpath in front of the newly erected Majestic Hall, offering to pay half of the cost. The Council agreed, so long as the job did not exceed £10.

The hall was designed to serve several functions: to show silent movies, for vaudeville productions, and to act as a social centre for the town. Over time it served as a venue for dances, balls, concerts, and wedding functions, roller skating, boxing, and church services. Constructed of unseasoned milled hardwood, the hall was about 12 metres (39 ft) wide by 18 metres (59 ft) long, with seating for 198 people. It included a sprung dance floor of 0.75-inch (19 mm) crow's ash timber, still extant today, and was raised on stumps to avoid flooding. The roof sagged inwards within several years of construction, and this profile remained until renovations during 2006 and 2007.

On either side of the entrance to the hall were small shops. On the left hand side was the Majestic Cafe, which also served as general store before being used for storage from the 1930s, and the right hand side's shop accommodated at various times a dentist, radio shop, and a mechanic. In the mid-1920s a supper room was added to the long southeast elevation of the hall, and this section was later extended to the northeast.

Travelling Picture Show Men initially called at the Majestic Hall to show silent movies, but in 1923 the hall was leased by Mrs Osborne to Harold "Picture" Page, who obtained a theatre license that year. Herbert Page (unrelated), of Page Furnishers, was called "Blue Shirt" Page, to distinguish him from Picture Page. Reportedly, the early silent films in Pomona were accompanied by a schoolgirl playing random music on a pianola. On 28 April 1931 the first talkie, or movie recorded with its own soundtrack, was shown at the hall, and around 1933 the hall's lease was transferred to Ernie Bazzo, who upgraded the hall to a theatre by adding a small gallery and a bio box. A number of local social functions were shifted to the new Pomona Memorial Hall during this decade. In the late 1930s Bazzo used seating from the Princess Theatre in South Brisbane to replace the existing canvas sling seating.

The Pomona Talkie Company was registered on 1 October 1935, and involved Errol Osborne, Ernest Bazzo, and Charles S. Thomson. Bazzo also owned the nearby Central Garage, and worked as a mechanic during the day, operating the theatre at night. The Majestic Theatre, Pomona is first listed under Theatres and Picture Shows in the Queensland Post Office Directory (Trades) in 1940, and the land on which the theatre stands was transferred to Bazzo in October 1948.

The development of the Majestic Theatre in Pomona reflected wider trends in Queensland's society. Moving pictures became a popular form of entertainment in Queensland soon after the first films were exhibited in Brisbane in the late 1890s. Hotels were often associated with early picture shows, especially in rural areas, where films might be shown in an adjacent hall or garden. Initially, travelling picture shows in rural areas were screened in halls, with the Picture Show Men travelling regular circuits, but later dedicated theatres were built in small towns, with a local resident – sometimes the local motor garage proprietor – working the projector.

Many theatres were built with attached retail spaces, including a cafe or milk bar for patrons, and a cantilevered street awning. As an alternative to purpose-built theatres, halls were regularly converted into picture theatres by erecting bio-boxes, installing a gallery, or adding new seating and sound equipment. Halls usually contained a supper room along the length of one side, for light meals during balls and other social functions.

From the 1910s until the advent of television, rural theatres provided an important social service to people in the surrounding area, including stimulus for the imagination, relief from isolation, and a link with the wider community in Australia and with United States' popular culture. Local picture theatres were also used as social venues for school concerts and dances, and many had level, sprung dance floors. Most small theatres were independently owned, with Queensland having more independent theatres than any other state in Australia. In the 1930s there were about 200 theatres in Queensland, and 75% of these were located outside Brisbane. However, post-war social, economic and technological trends would eventually spell the end for most small rural picture theatres. Almost half of the theatres exhibiting in 1960 and 1961 (388 in Queensland) had closed by 1971.

The Majestic Theatre was operated by Ernie Bazzo until he suffered a stroke in 1973. Its busiest period was during World War II, when a Tank Attack (anti-tank gun) Regiment was stationed near Pomona. The troops had priority for seats, and local civilians were irate when they could not get in. Often, people would watch from outside, standing in the middle of the road, which was then the original Bruce Highway. The theatre remained popular after the war, and throughout the 1940s to the 1960s films were shown on Wednesday and Friday evenings and Saturday afternoon, with a cartoon and two movies for four shillings and sixpence. In 1956 the original projector equipment was replaced with equipment from the Tivoli Theatre in Brisbane. At the interval between movies, patrons adjourned to the Kia Ora Cafe next door for pies. This building, later known as the Majestic Cafe, was located north of the theatre, and burnt down c.2002.

In 1973 Ron and Mandy West introduced the Travelling Film Festival, which featured first-release and avant garde films, to the Majestic Theatre, and the festival screened at Pomona until 1994. The Wests purchased the theatre in 1974, although title to the land on which it stands was not transferred until January 1979. The Majestic remained the Noosa Shire's only picture theatre until 1984. The film projection equipment was replaced in 1980, and a DVD system was installed in 2003.

Ron West was raised in New Zealand, where he worked in picture theatres as an ice cream boy and a projectionist, and he also worked in theatre stage management, and as a musician or conductor in orchestra music pits. During 13 years as a sound engineer for the Commonwealth Film Unit in Sydney, he ventured into film production and photography. Ron's late wife Mandy shared his interest in the theatre, and during the 1980s she directed an amateur theatrical group, The Majestic Players, in pantomimes and plays on stage at the Majestic, the stage having been enlarged in 1979. Classical concerts were also held on Sunday afternoons by visiting musicians. Around April 1985 Judith Durham (of The Seekers) and her husband Ronald Edgeworth gave concerts on Friday, Saturday and Sunday for five weekends. In the early 1990s school plays were performed at the Majestic.

During the 1980s the theatre also operated as a video hire outlet to help keep it viable. In 1987 West was asked to show a silent movie to a group of travel agents, and since he possessed a print of the 1926 film The Son of the Sheik, starring Rudolf Valentino, he ran the film and accompanied it with his restored Wurlitzer pipe organ, making up the music as he went along. Word got around, and after several months the Wests decided to only show silent movies at the Majestic, which gained worldwide recognition as a silent movie house. Six days a week, the Majestic was open to school visits and coach loads of Australian and international tourists. The most popular silent films shown since 1987 include The Son of the Sheik, the original Raymond Longford production of Dad and Dave in On our Selection, and Charlie Chaplin and Jackie Cooper in The Kid. In 2004 West received the premier Noosa Shire Australia Day Award for his services to culture and the community.

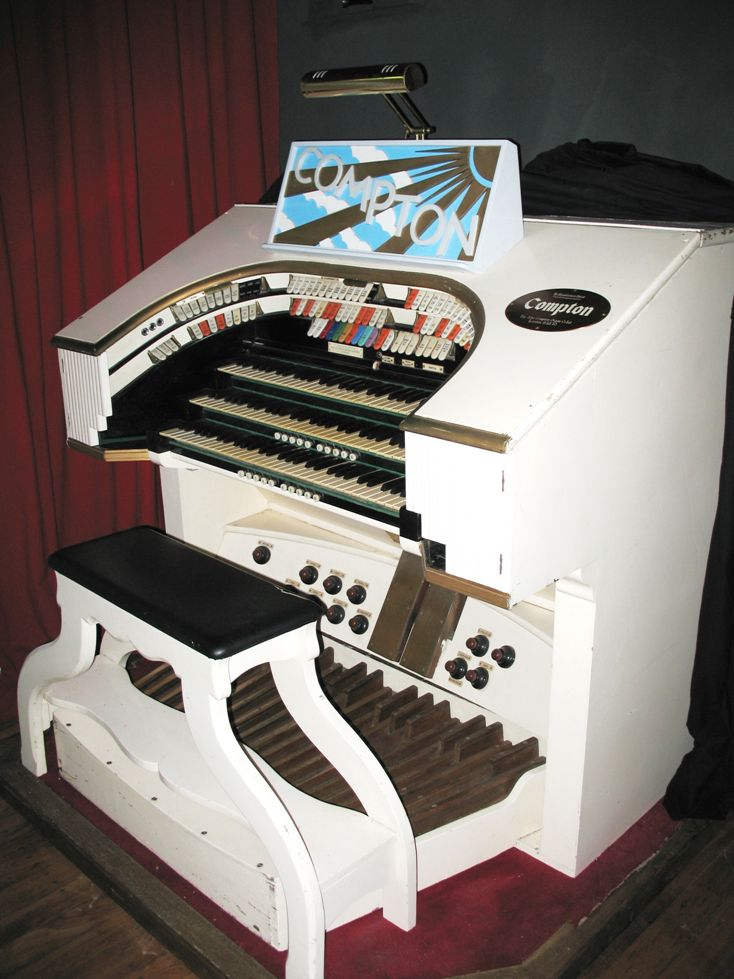
1936 Organ from the Regal Cinema, South Shields, England

West has an interest in pipe organs, and he has used them to accompany the silent films at the Majestic. The current organ console, the only one in a Queensland theatre, is located to the left of the stage and is an electrical 1936 Compton from the Regal Cinema in South Shields, England. It was rebuilt during 2006 and 2007 by West and John Brooks. The pipe chamber, which also contains a bank of 1930s electrical organ switches from the Theatre Royal in Halifax, is located within the former supper room extension on the south east side of the theatre. Three ranks of Christie pipes in the chamber were originally from a theatre in Dunedin, New Zealand, and were owned by a church in Sydney before they were acquired by West in 1985. Other ranks of pipes have been obtained, with the hope of eventually having 12 ranks.

West did not just collect pipe organ parts – the timber organ grill that separates the organ room from the auditorium is made of Oregon pine, and comes from the Roxy Theatre in Parramatta. In the past West has also salvaged stage drapes, furnishings and equipment from the Regent, Wintergarden, Her Majesty's theatres in Brisbane, and the Wintergarden in Ipswich. The former office of the Pomona Butter Factory (since incorporated into the Page Furnishers' factory complex) was given to the Wests and now stands behind the theatre.

In late 2006 the land on which the theatre stands was transferred to Pomona Progress Art Tourism Inc, a community group which intends to run the Majestic Theatre as an all-purpose entertainment venue. Ron West stayed on to manage the theatre and to play the organ during silent movies. In September 2006 the first team of SkillCentred Community Jobs Project workers (whose wages were paid by the Queensland Government), began an upgrade of the theatre, which reopened in mid 2007. Grants were also provided by the Noosa Shire Council and the Australian Government.

Upgrades included restumping the building with steel, replacing the roofing iron and correcting the roof's sag with steel reinforcement, bracing walls, refixing much of the exterior cladding, and replacing interior linings and the ceiling. Asbestos boards used in the building were replaced with modern materials. The fixed seating was removed and was replaced with moveable seating built by Page Furnishers, and the organ chamber was rebuilt and extended. The roof of the stage was raised to match the roof of the auditorium, the floor of the dressing room was raised to stage level, and new sliding doors were installed at the rear of the building. The former Majestic Cafe was refurbished for use as Valentino's Restaurant, while the former shop space to the right of the main entrance was refurbished as a modern kitchen. The sprung dance floor was sanded back and oiled, the toilet area was modernised, and a snack and beverages bar was installed in the foyer. New paths and ramps have been added around the building's exterior.

== Description ==
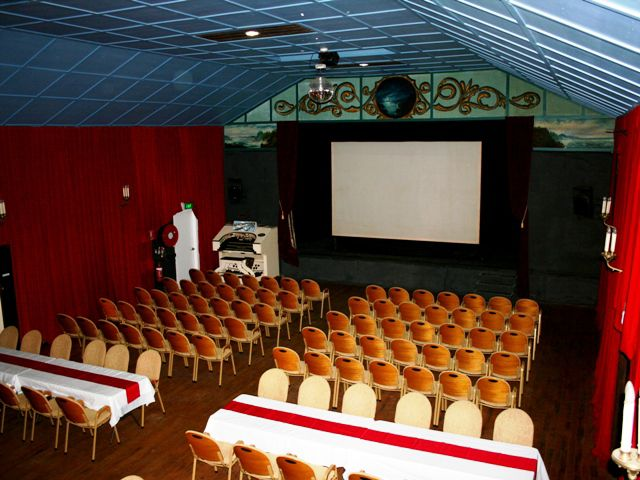
Interior, Majestic Theatre, 2009

At the south end of Factory Street on the east side of the railway line, the Majestic Theatre stands prominently in the streetscape of the Pomona.

A long rectangular cream-painted building, with a striking red trim picking out a number of element (posts, window sills, fascias and cover strips), the theatre is sheltered by a gable roof clad in corrugated metal sheeting crowned with a barrel-roofed ventilation ridge. The roof is concealed from the street by a three-part timber framed parapet with curved fibreboard panels. A bull nosed awning supported by bevelled timber posts with decorative Y-shaped brackets projects out from the building sheltering the footpath. The building is clad with chamferboards and stands on low concrete stumps. Metal screens run on rails along the north side of the building shading the large web lattice screen to the restaurant.

A gable roofed bio-box projects from the building over the central entrance, within the awning. Clad with fibreboard fixed with batten cover strips, the bio-box has two pairs of casement windows overlooking the street. The underside of the bio-box forms a ceiling to the entrance and is lined with fibreboard with cover strips formed into decorative diamond patterns.

Timber steps rise from the footpath to the timber floored entrance porch, the sides of which funnel in towards the pair of large timber entrance doors. The walls to the porch are clad with vertical timber boards. The early ticket booth window, now boarded up, is to the right hand side of the entrance porch.

The theatre is organised around the central auditorium, with flanking sides accommodating a restaurant and toilets to the north; and a cafe, commercial kitchen, organ room and storage to the south. The small foyer has a plain battened fibreboard ceiling sloping towards the auditorium and accommodates a recently fitted bar and ticket booth. It opens to the sides to the restaurant and cafe. A timber framed partition lined with fibreboard separates the foyer and auditorium. A dress circle sits above the foyer and is reached by a set of timber stairs to the left of the doorway from the foyer into the auditorium. The dress circle has a sloping timber floor and accommodates several rows of moveable seats. The bio-box standing to the rear of the dress circle is newly lined with plasterboard and accommodates the electronic console controlling the film projection.

The auditorium has a flat (not raked, as often found in theatres) floor of fine crow's ash boards and a coved ceiling newly lined with plasterboard with plain batten cover strips. Timber vents run around the perimeter at skirting level. A raised, timber-floored stage with a decorated proscenium arch stands at the east end of the auditorium. The proscenium arch has decorative scrolls to the overhead centre panel and painted landscape scenes to the horizontal side panels. A round framed landscape painting sits to the centre of decorative scrollwork. A white painted Compton organ console stands in the auditorium to the left of the stage. A timber fretted screen to the right side wall allows the projection of sound from the plant room of the organ housed in the room adjacent. The plant for the organ includes pipes, various sound effects mechanisms, wiring and other apparatus.

Remnants of an earlier decorative paint scheme remain to the side walls of auditorium presently covered by long red serge curtains. The scheme is notable for a decorative wallpaper dado frieze. Recent moveable metal framed and fabric upholstered chairs made by Page Furnishers of Pomona can be arranged in rows within the auditorium or stacked when not in use.

The stage opens externally to the rear by sliding doors onto a narrow timber floored dock running across the exterior the building.

The two flanking shopfronts each have large two-light clear glass windows with six small patterned lights above and a narrow timber entrance door. Valentino's Restaurant is accommodated within the north side shop space. The interior decorative scheme includes a copy of the early decorative dado motif and paint scheme found in theatre auditorium.

The roof framing is strengthened with steel sleeves to the timber trusses.

A plaque indicating the theatre is part of the Pomona heritage walk is fixed to the front of the building. A newly concreted footpath has metal stars set within it recognising those who have contributed to the ongoing success of the theatre, including Ron and Mandy West.

== Heritage listing ==
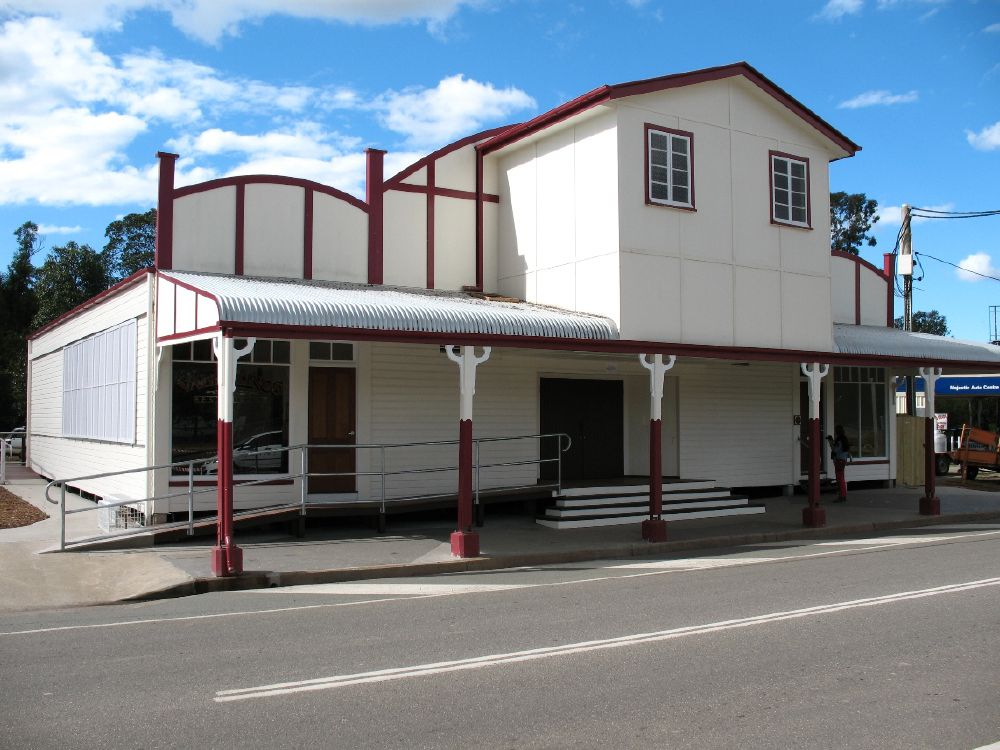
The Majestic in 2007 as it looked at the time of heritage registration.

The Majestic Theatre was listed on the Queensland Heritage Register on 5 February 2009 having satisfied the following criteria.

The place is important in demonstrating the evolution or pattern of Queensland's history.

The Majestic Theatre in Pomona, a venue that has shown films continuously since 1921, is important in demonstrating the development of picture theatres in Queensland and the part that picture-going played in the life of rural Queenslanders from the 1920s to the 1950s. The Majestic Theatre, constructed as the Majestic Hall and modified in the 1930s to show "talkies", also demonstrates the evolution of film exhibition venues in Queensland, whereby community halls were often used to show pictures, prior to converting the hall into a picture theatre, or constructing a purpose-built cinema. In addition, it demonstrates the practice of independent film exhibition by owner-operators in rural Queensland towns.

The place demonstrates rare, uncommon or endangered aspects of Queensland's cultural heritage.

The Majestic theatre is rare as one of the few pre-World War II picture theatres remaining in Queensland that have not been demolished or adapted to other uses. It is also Queensland's longest continuously operating picture theatre.

The place is important in demonstrating the principal characteristics of a particular class of cultural places.

Although the Majestic Theatre was recently refurbished, its floor plan and design still illustrates the characteristics of a small rural picture theatre that has been adapted from a local hall. These characteristics include the hall's original retail spaces and the supper room section on the southeast elevation. The installation of a bio-box and gallery was also a typical means of converting a hall into a picture theatre.

The place has a strong or special association with a particular community or cultural group for social, cultural or spiritual reasons.

Over the last 20 years the Majestic Theatre has developed a following of silent film enthusiasts, and its popularity ensured that the theatre's refurbishment during 2006–2007 received financial support from private individuals and businesses as well as from the Local, State, and Federal governments.

== Supporters ==
- Noosa Council
- Noosa FM 101.3 Community Radio
- Pomona & District Community House
