= Mary Emelia Mayne =

Australian philanthropist

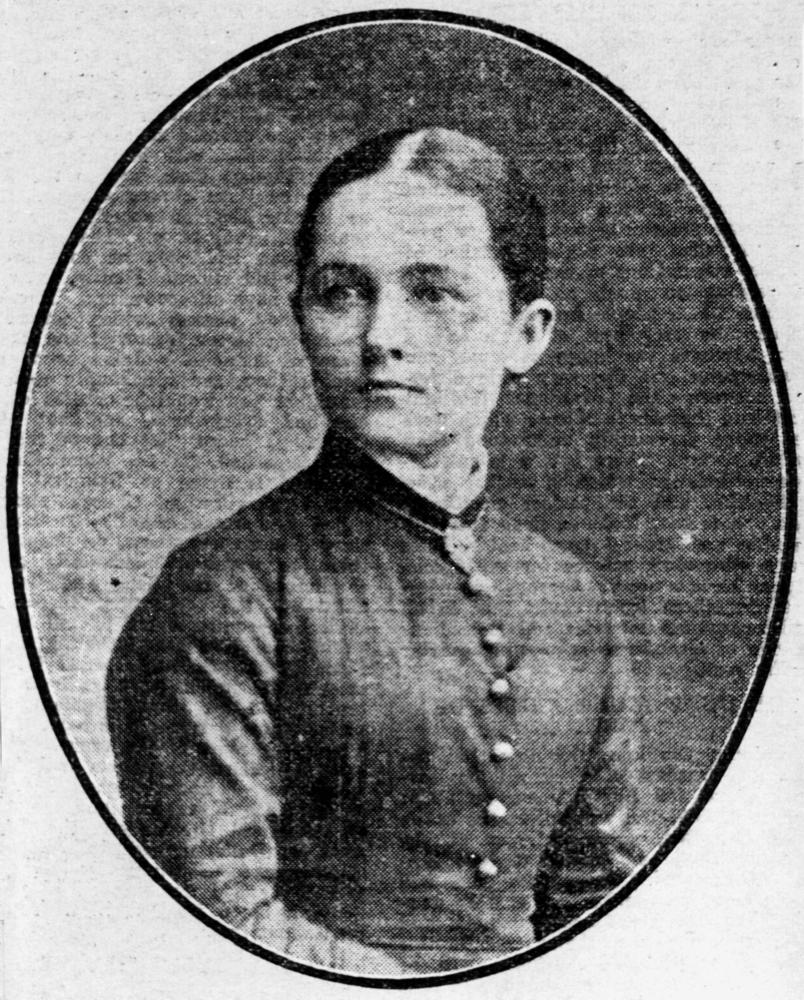
Mary Emelia Mayne, 1926

Mary Emelia Mayne (31 December 1858 – 12 August 1940), was an Australian philanthropist.

== Early life ==
Mayne was born in Brisbane, Colony of New South Wales in 1858. The area would become part of the Colony of Queensland in 1859. Mary Emelia Mayne was the second youngest of five children of Irish parents, Patrick Mayne, a butcher and grazier, and his wife Mary McIntosh Mayne. She attended All Hallows' School, a Catholic girls' school in Brisbane, until 1877. Thereafter she oversaw and hostessed many functions at Moorlands, the family home at Auchenflower. She and her siblings all inherited real estate, giving them independent means. Neither she nor her siblings would marry.

== James O'Neil Mayne ==
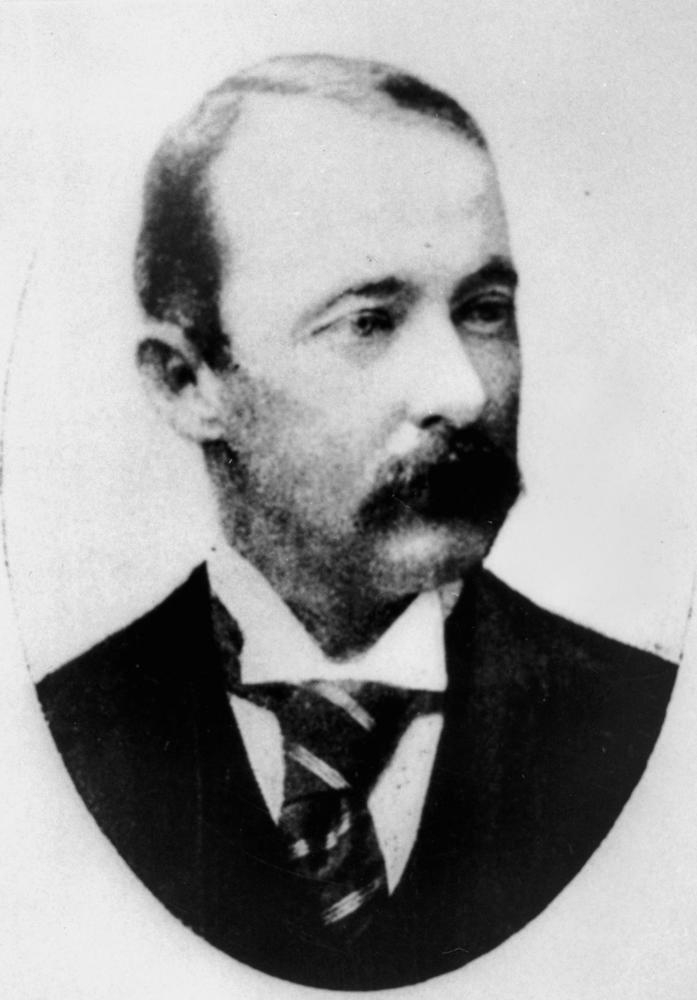
James O'Neil Mayne, c. 1900

James O'Neil Mayne (28 January 1861 – 31 January 1939), one of her brothers, attended Brisbane Grammar School, graduated with a B.A. from the University of Sydney in 1884, and studied medicine at University College London, receiving the qualifications of Licentiate of the Royal College of Physicians (LRCS) and Membership of the Royal College of Physicians (MRCS) in 1890. James Mayne worked as a doctor at the Brisbane General Hospital from 1891 until 1898. James O'Neil Mayne died at Moorlands.

== Philanthropy ==
The Mayne family made Moorlands available to the Red Cross working parties during World War I, and contributed to the Anglican St Martin's War Memorial Hospital.

James and Mary Emelia Mayne became the principal benefactors of the University of Queensland giving it 280 hectares of land at Pinjarra Hills for agricultural education in 1923. After negotiations beginning in 1926, they paid a further £63,000 to resume over 281 hectares at St Lucia. This site became the current University of Queensland campus.

The ornate Mayne family tomb at Brisbane's Toowong Cemetery

== Death ==
Mary Emelia Mayne died in the Mater Misericordiae Private Hospital (run by the Sisters of Mercy who also controlled her school, All Hallows') during World War II on 12 August 1940. Mary Emelia Mayne and James O'Neil Mayne are buried in the Toowong Cemetery in the family tomb, which the university was requested to maintain.

== Wills ==
Their wills demonstrate that James Mayne's estate was valued for probate at £113,334 and Emilia Mayne's at £83,375. Their chief assets were listed as the prestigious Brisbane Arcade, the Regent Building, and Moorlands. Identical wills provided that the estates be applied in perpetuity for the university's medical school.

== Legacy ==
They are commemorated by the Mayne chairs of medicine and surgery, the Dr James Mayne Building at the Royal Brisbane and Women's Hospital, the Mayne String Trio and Mayne Hall where there is a bronze plaque of them by Kathleen Shillam. A portrait of Mayne by Melville Haysom hangs in the University of Queensland Art Museum which is named the James and Mary Emelia Mayne Centre.

== See also ==
- The Mayne Inheritance
