= Ceiling rose =

Decorative element affixed to the ceiling

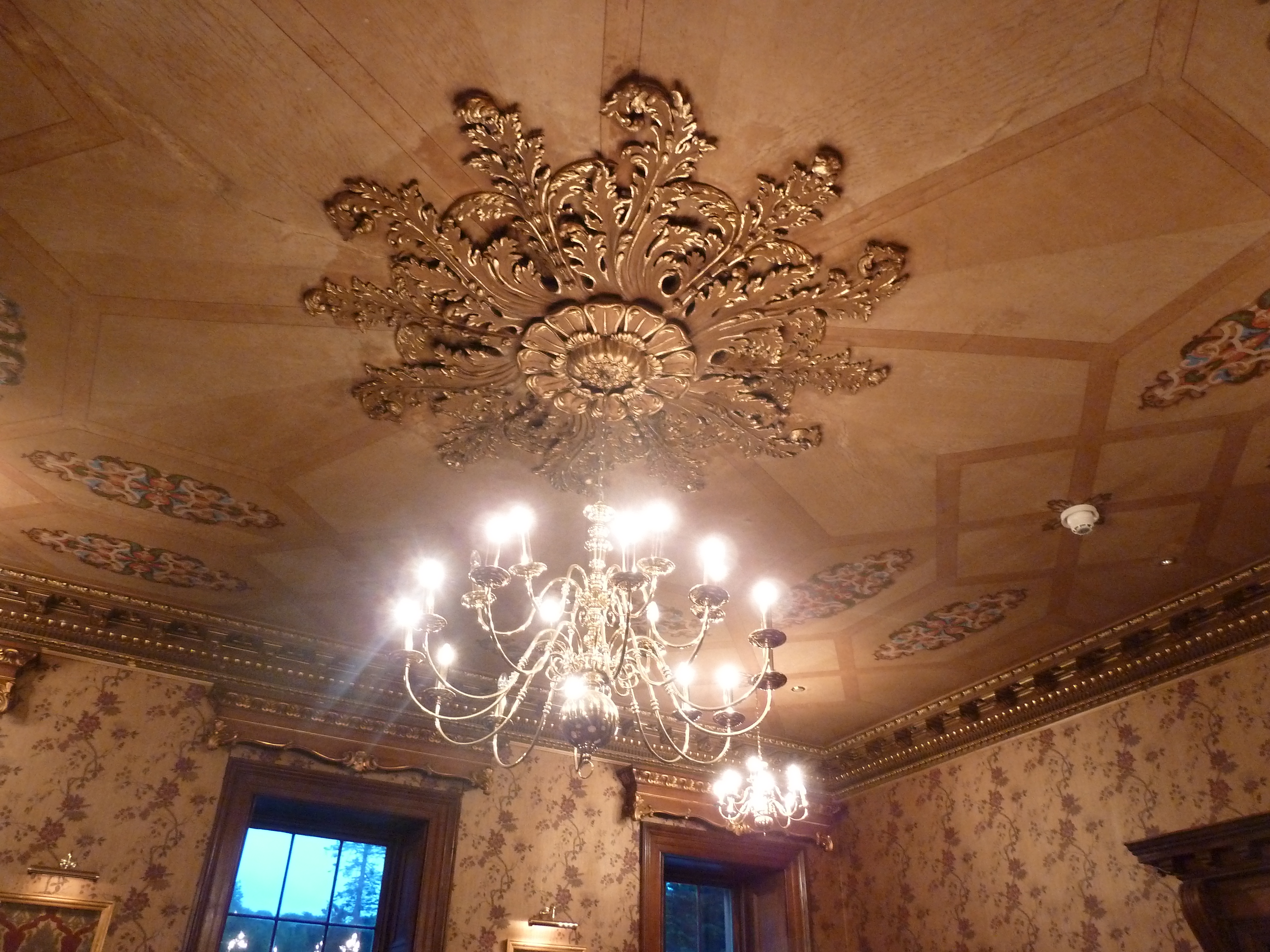
Chandelier and ceiling rose, Glynllifon

In the United Kingdom and Australia, a ceiling rose is a decorative element affixed to the ceiling from which a chandelier or light fitting is often suspended. They are typically round in shape and display a variety of ornamental designs.

In modern British wiring setups, light fittings usually use loop-in ceiling roses, which also include the functionality of a junction box.

== Etymology ==
The rose has symbolised secrecy since Roman times, due to a confused association with the Egyptian god Horus. For its associations with ceilings and confidentiality, refer to the Scottish Government's Sub Rosa initiative. Through its promise of secrecy, the rose, suspended above a meeting table, symbolises the freedom to speak plainly without repercussion. The physical carving of a rose on a ceiling was used for this purpose during the rule of England's Tudor King Henry VIII and has over the centuries evolved into a standard item of domestic vernacular architecture, to such an extent that it now constitutes a term for the aforementioned circular device that conceals and comprises the wiring box for an overhead light fitting.

== See also ==
- Sub rosa
