= The Mayne Inheritance =

Book by Rosamond Siemon

The Mayne Inheritance: a gothic tale of murder, madness and scandal across the generations
- Author: Rosamond Siemon
- Language: English
- Genre: Historical Biography
- Publisher: University of Queensland Press
- Publication place: Australia
- English publication date: 1997
- Media type: Print (hardcover)
- ISBN: 0702234222

The Mayne Inheritance is a non-fiction narrative written by Queensland author Rosamond Siemon. It was first published in 1997 by University of Queensland Press, and a new edition with updated information was issued by the same publisher in 2003. The book won the Brisbane City Council's One Book One Brisbane competition in 2003.

== Plot and themes ==
The Mayne Inheritance tells the story of Patrick Mayne, a young man who migrated to Australia from his impoverished background in County Tyrone, Ireland in 1841. He was born in Cookstown, County Tyrone, Ireland on 23 December 1823. He soon moved to the infant town of Brisbane where he found work as a slaughterman in an abattoir. In 1848 a sawyer, Robert Cox, was savagely murdered at Kangaroo Point and a considerable amount of money was presumed to have been stolen.

The next year, Patrick Mayne married and, despite being a poorly paid labourer, bought his own butcher's shop in what is now Brisbane's central business district. He then expanded his business empire through investing cleverly and soon became one of Brisbane's richest men. Patrick became one of the aldermen on the first Brisbane Municipal Council in 1859.

He died in 1865 from an unspecified illness. According to the book, it was widely believed that, during his dying days, he confessed to the murder of Robert Cox. He left behind a widow and five children who had to survive in a hostile colonial environment which ostracised them for being the children of a supposedly confessed murderer. The second half of the book deals mainly with the lives of these children, none of whom married, and in particular James O'Neil Mayne who used the wealth inherited from his father to become a philanthropist. His most notable deed was funding the purchase of 270 acres (1.1 km^{2}) of land at St Lucia for the University of Queensland. This spacious riverside site is still the main campus of the university. The Pinjarra Hills campus was also a component of the philanthropy.

The story of The Mayne Inheritance spans nearly a century, from Patrick's arrival in Australia in the 1840s to the death of his last surviving child, Mary Emelia Mayne, in 1940, at the age of 81. The narrative takes place within the context of Brisbane's history, and the reader is also taken on the journey of Brisbane's transformation from an isolated colonial hamlet to a major Australian city.

== Adaptations ==
The book was adapted for the stage by Errol O'Neill and premiered at Brisbane's La Boite Theatre in 2004.
