= Queen Street, Brisbane =

Street in Brisbane's CBD

Coordinates: 27°28′4.74″S 153°1′38.54″E

Queen Street, Brisbane Queensland
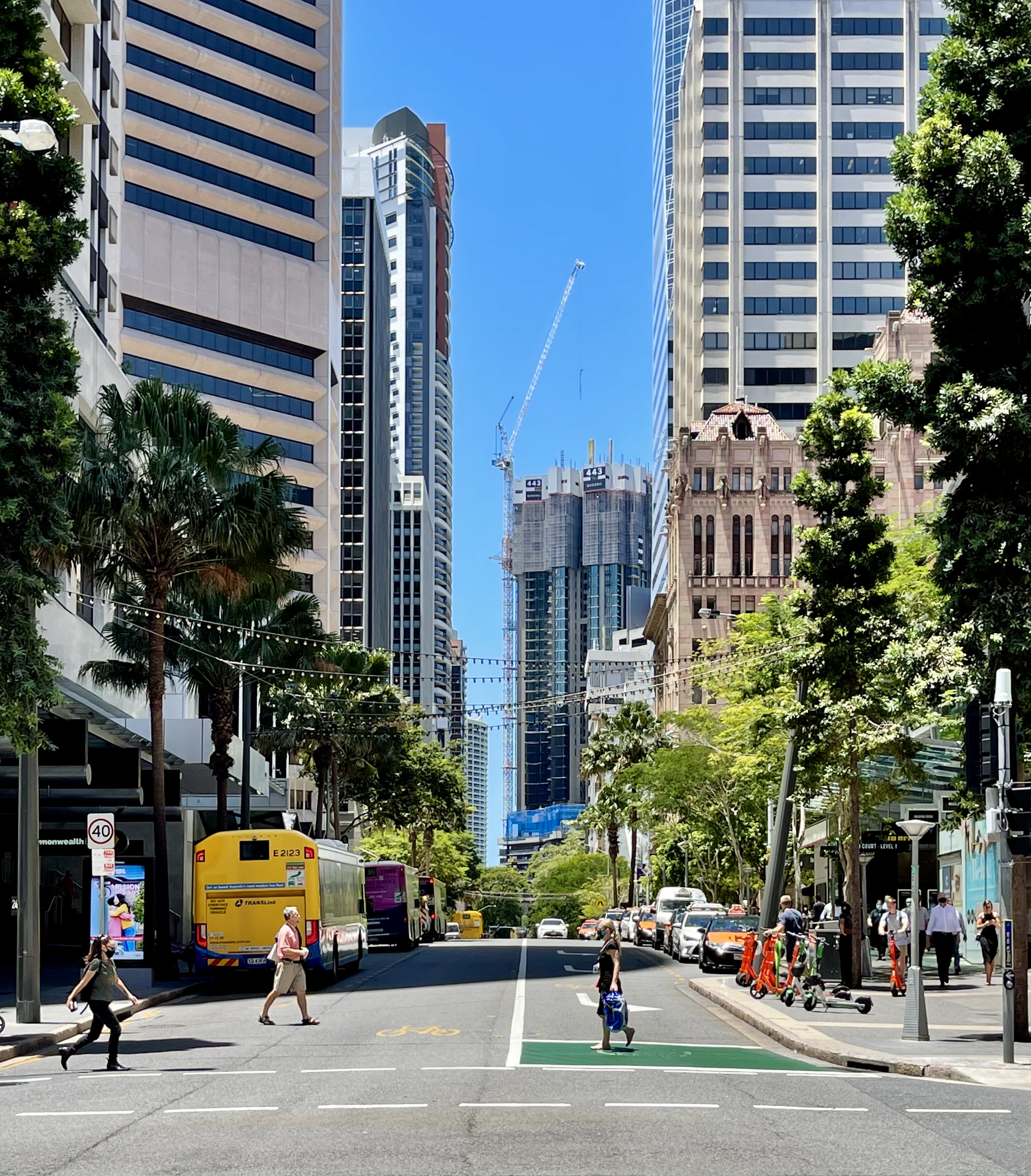
- View from Queen Street Mall

General information
- Type: Street

Major junctions
- West end: Victoria Bridge, North Quay
- George Street, Albert Street, Edward Street, Creek Street, Adelaide Street
- East end: Ann Street

Location(s)
- LGA(s): City of Brisbane

Restrictions
- General: Partially pedestrianised

Highway system
- Highways in Australia; National Highway • Freeways in Australia; Highways in Queensland

Queen Street is the main street of Brisbane, Queensland, Australia. It is named for Queen Victoria of the United Kingdom. The street is the location of the eponymous Queen Street Mall, a pedestrian thoroughfare that is widely regarded as the civic heart of Brisbane.

The western part of the street is covered by a new plaza at the base of Brisbane Square and underneath part of the western half is the Queen Street bus station.

Queen Street is heavily built up with arcades, shops, hotels, offices and apartment high-rises such as MacArthur Central, Brisbane Square, Central Plaza, Aurora Tower, Treasury Casino, Wintergarden, Broadway on the Mall, The Myer Centre and QueensPlaza. Queen Street is also the location of Brisbane's General Post Office.

== Geography ==
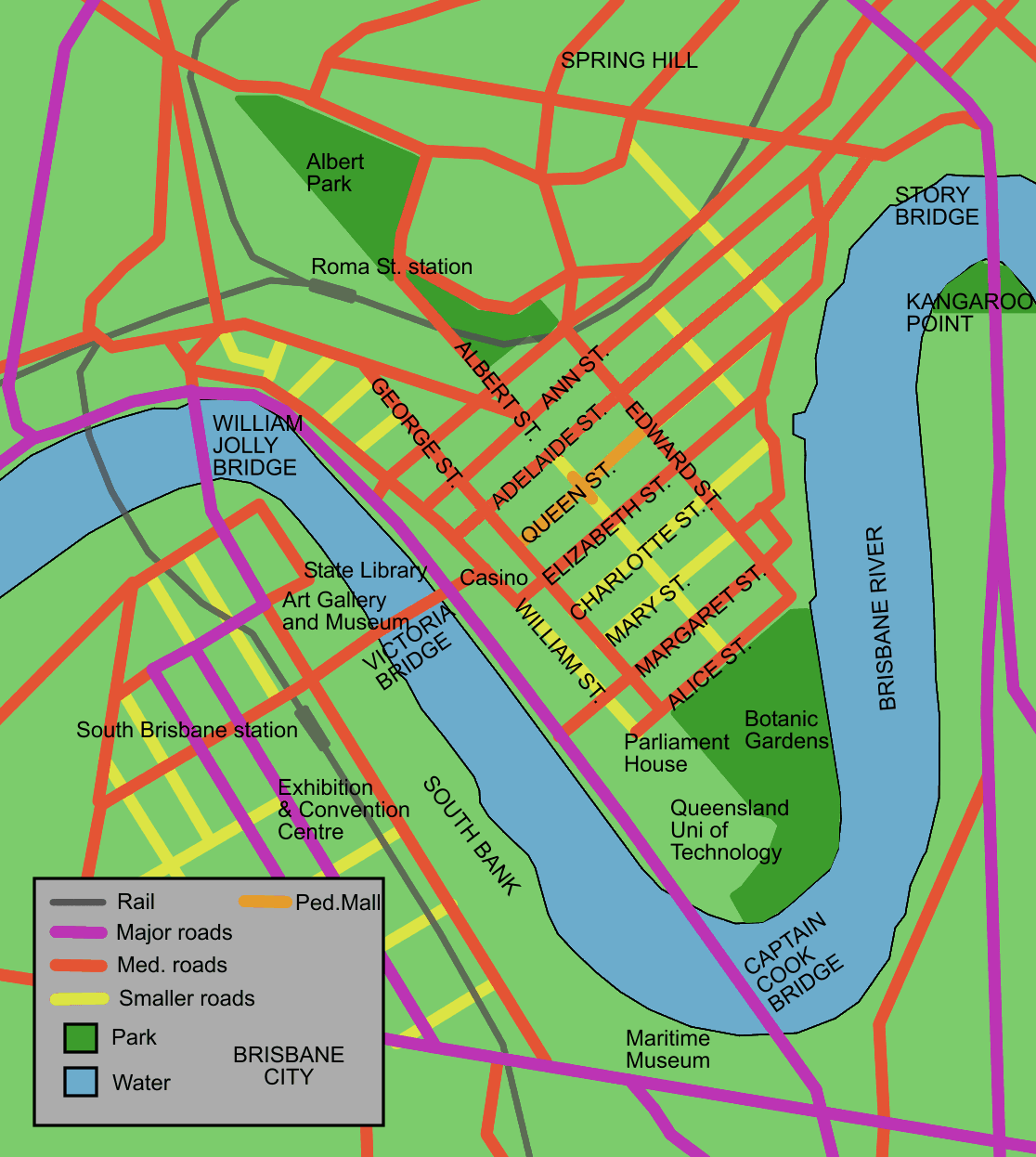
Map of Brisbane CBD

Queen Street is the city's central road, partly covered by a pedestrian mall called the Queen Street Mall. It ends at the Victoria Bridge and is bounded by two of the Brisbane River's central reaches. Uptown at the top of the mall is George Street.

The next street parallel to the south is Elizabeth Street, while Adelaide Street is the next parallel street to the north.

== History ==
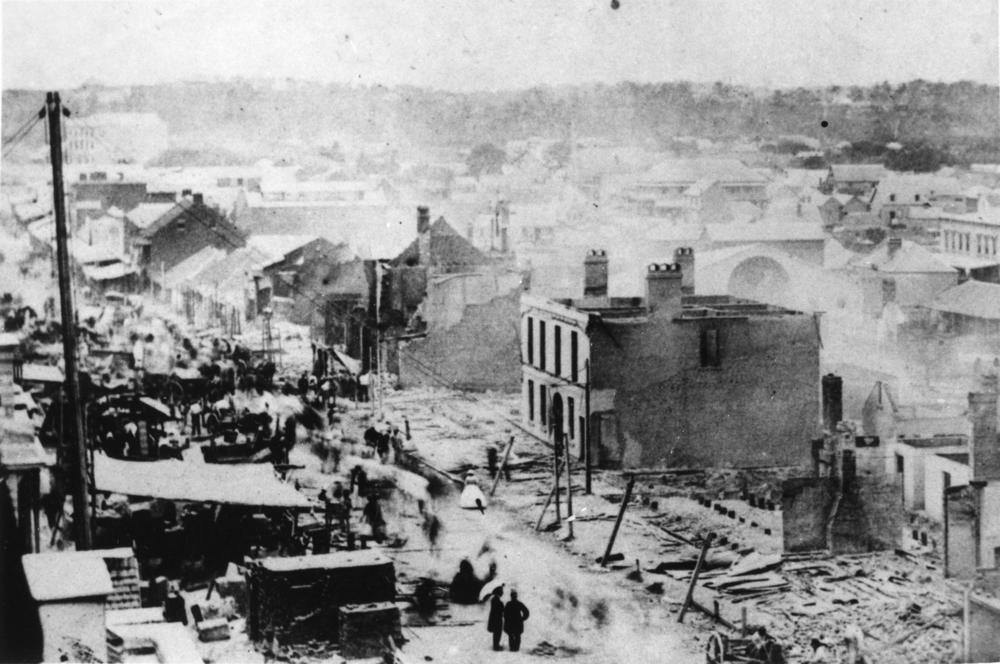
Great fire of Brisbane

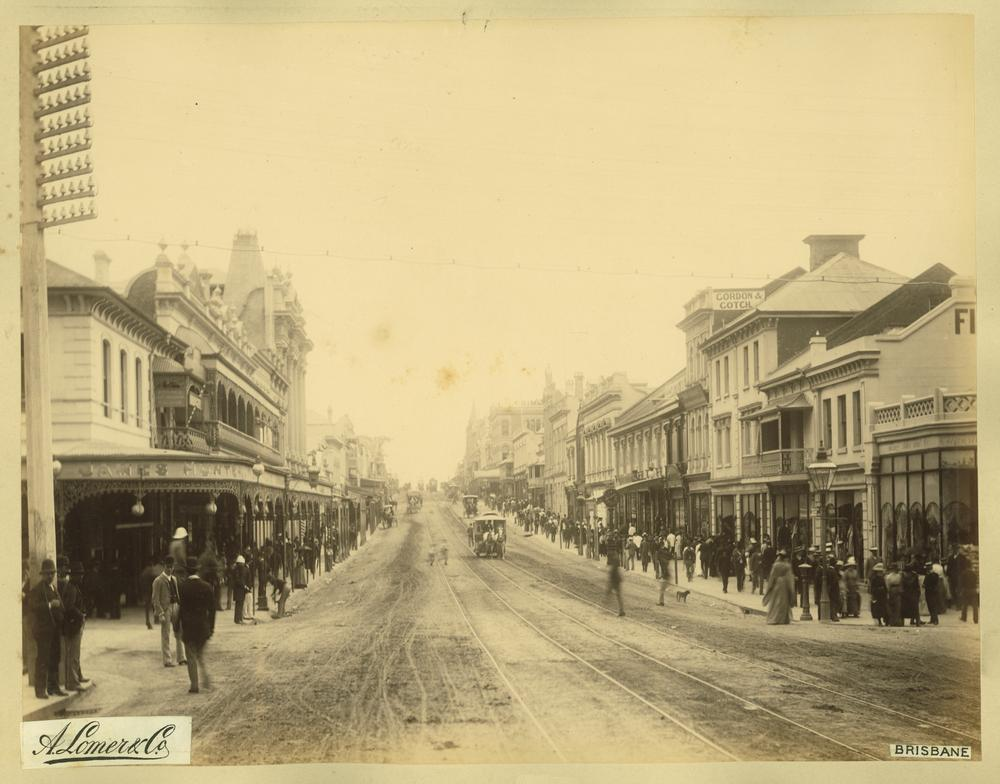
Queen Street in 1889

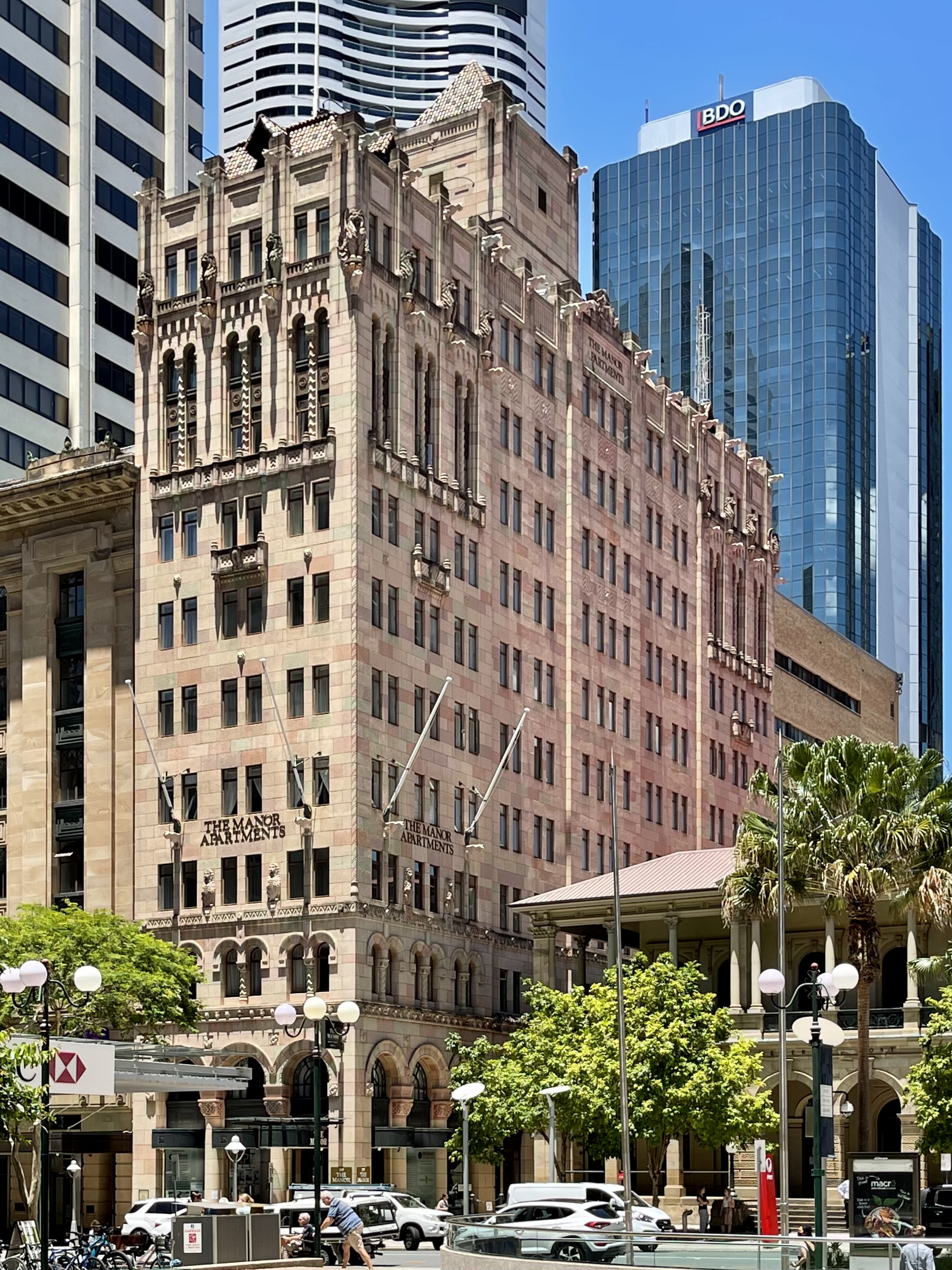
Manor Apartments

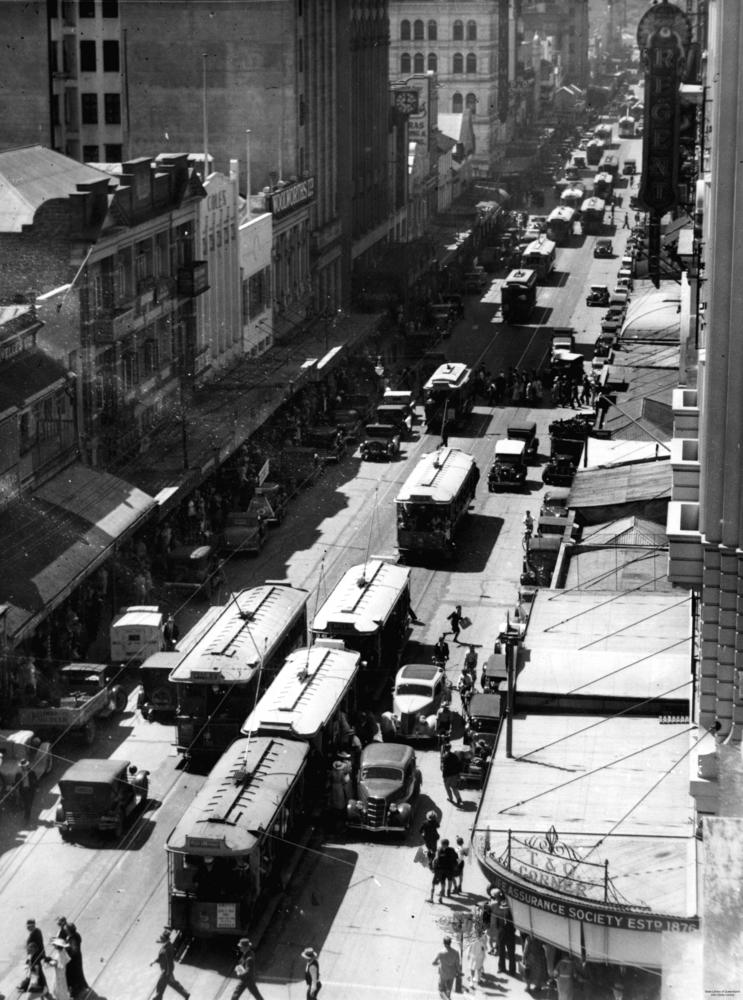
Queen Street, Brisbane, ca. 1935

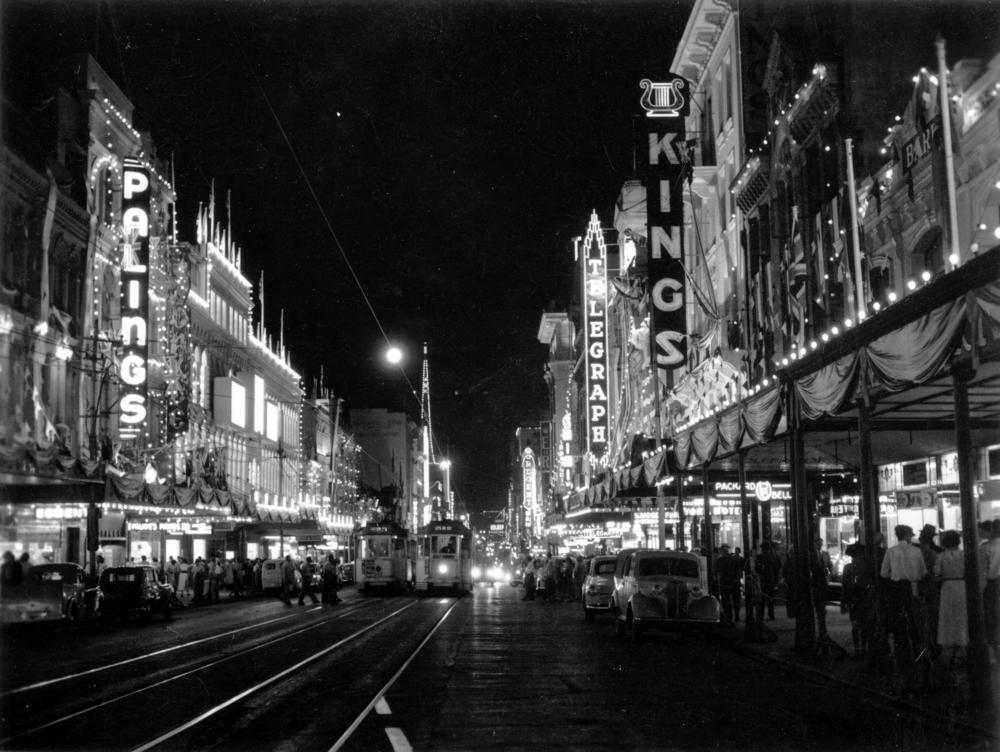
Queen Street, Brisbane, with decorations for the royal visit in 1954

Before 1842 and free settlement, Queen Street was originally a track leading from the main section of the early Moreton Bay Penal Colony, crossing a stream known as Wheat Creek with a deviation going up to the Windmill. In early 1840, a surveyor named Dixon drew up a survey for the central Brisbane streets with all streets 66 feet (20 metres) wide. Changes were then made to this plan with square blocks flattened into a rectangular grid with streets becoming 1.4 chains (27 metres). On Governor Gipps' visit to Brisbane Town in March 1842, Gipps remarked that Brisbane Town was "simply an ordinary provincial settlement", which would need no grand avenues. As a result, Gipps moved the planned width of Queen Street, along with other streets, back to 66 feet (20 metres), arguing that this change would mean that buildings could be kept out of the sun.

Later, there was compromise with the main street that would be known as Queen Street, with the western boundary's width changed to 1.2 chains (24 metres).

The first sitting of Legislative Assembly of Queensland in May 1860 occurred in the old converted convict barracks on Queen Street.

In 1864, there were two significant fires along the street. The September 1864 fire started in the Little Wonder store on Edward Street which destroyed 14 shops in Queen Street. This event later became known as Bulcock's Fire. On 1 December 1864, the Great Fire of Brisbane started within the cellar of a Queen Street drapery store which burnt down buildings bordering Queen Street, as well as Albert Street, Edward Street, George Street and Elizabeth Street. Brisbane Courier described the fire as "the whole of the business premises and private residences...were, in a couple of hours, reduced to a heap of ruins".

On 9 December 1882, a demonstration of electricity was conducted with eight arc lights along Queen Street. Power was supplied by a 10 hp generator driven by a small engine in a foundry in Adelaide Street. This was Australia's first recorded use of electricity for public purposes.

In 1885, Poul C. Poulsen opened his photographic studio at 7 Queen Street. Ada Driver trained at Poulson's studio before opening her own photographic studio, 'Ada Driver's Studio', at 51 Queen street in 1906.

In 1902, part of Queen Street was not paved or sealed although stormwater drainage was well maintained.

Queen Street is historically significant as it contains MacArthur Central, the building in which the American General Douglas MacArthur had his South West Pacific headquarters (from July 1942 to November 1944) during World War II and directed the Allied Forces campaign. The former AMP building was later renamed MacArthur Central as a tribute to General MacArthur.

Tram services along Queen Street were converted to buses on 14 April 1969.

In 1981, the part of the street between Albert Street and Edward Street was closed to traffic. This section was opened as the Queen Street Mall in 1982, in time for the Commonwealth Games. Later, the section between Albert Street and George Street was converted into an extension of the pedestrian mall, timed to coincide with Brisbane's Expo '88.

A number of buildings were demolished on Queen Street in the 1980s, including Her Majesty's Theatre, the Wintergarden cinema and the Odeon cinema as the mall development proceeded.

== Heritage listings ==
There are many heritage-listed buildings in Queen Street, including:

- 21 Queen Street: Treasury Building
- 33 Queen Street: Bank of New South Wales Building
- 43 Queen Street: Trustees Chambers
- 62 Queen Street: Colonial Mutual Chambers
- 86 Queen Street: Palings Building (also known as City International Duty Free)
- 110 Queen Street: Allan and Stark Building (also known as former Myer Store)
- 114 Queen Street: Gardams Building
- 116 Queen Street: Hardy Brothers Building
- 120 Queen Street: Edwards and Chapman Building
- 160 Queen Street: Brisbane Arcade
- 167 Queen Street: Regent Theatre
- 180 Queen Street: National Australia Bank (180 Queen Street)
- 196 Queen Street: Finney Isles & Co Building
- 229 Queen Street: MacArthur Chambers
- 270 Queen Street: Sir William Glasgow Memorial
- 289 Queen Street: Newspaper House (now the Manor Apartment Hotel)
- 299 Queen Street: National Mutual Life Building
- 308 Queen Street: National Australia Bank (308 Queen Street) and its First World War Honour Board (separate listings)
- 424–426 Queen Street: Queensland Country Life Building facade
- 427 Queen Street: former Brisbane Customs House
- 443–501 Queen Street: Petrie Bight Retaining Wall
- 560 Queen Street: Orient Hotel

The present Hungry Jack's fast food restaurant occupies Beak House, a listed building previously owned by a farming and investment company. The present McDonald's restaurant is located directly opposite in the building formerly occupied by Jo Jo's Restaurant.

== Major intersections ==
- North Quay / William Street
- George Street
- Albert Street
- Edward Street
- Creek Street
- Wharf Street / Eagle Street
- Adelaide Street
- Ann Street

== See also ==
- Road transport in Brisbane
