= Queen Street bus station =

Bus station in Brisbane, Queensland

Queen Street
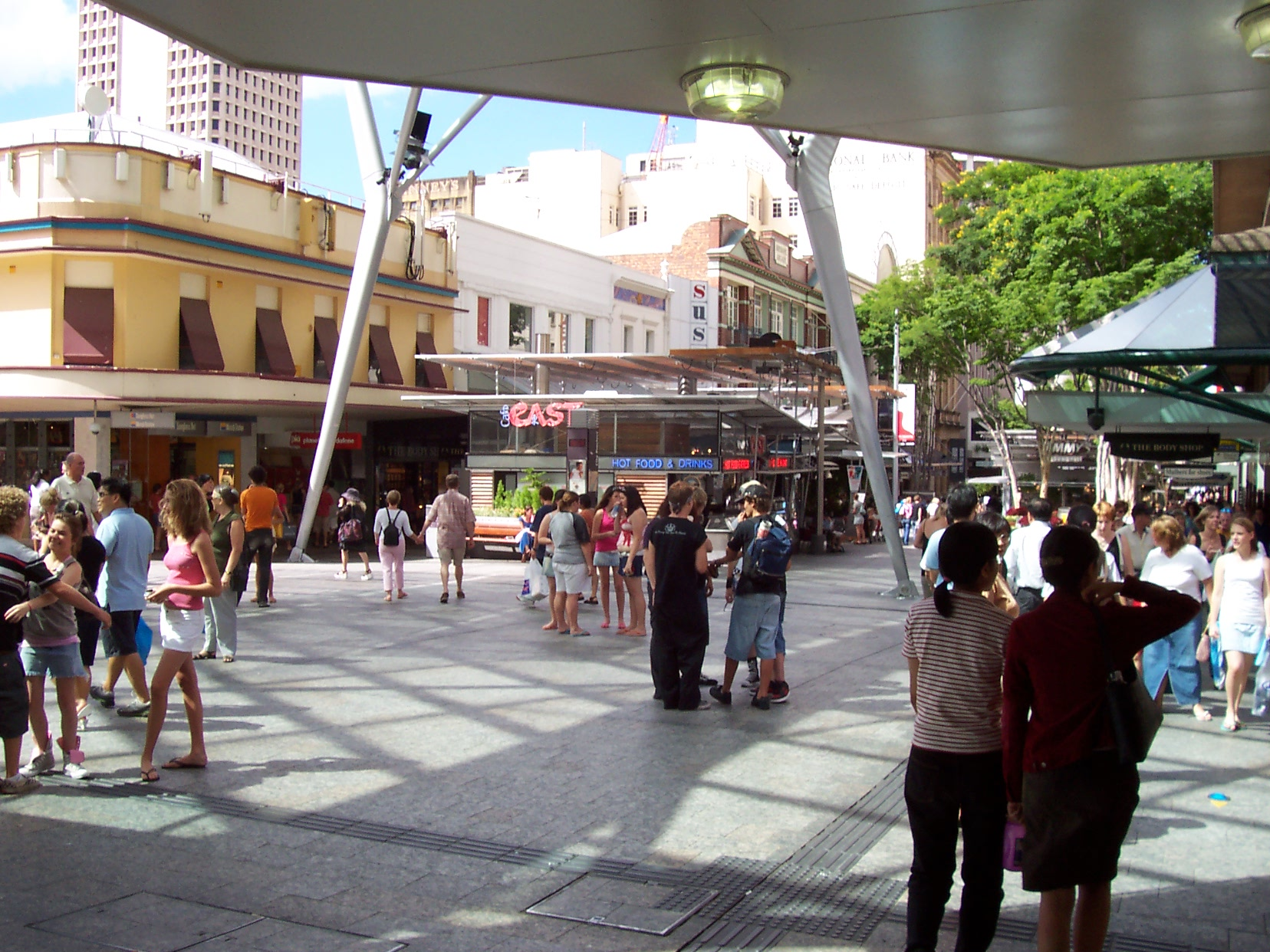

General information
- Location: Queen Street, Brisbane
- Coordinates: 27°28′13″S 153°01′30.6″E
- Owner: Department of Transport & Main Roads
- Operator: Transport for Brisbane
- Platforms: 3 side
- Bus routes: 18
- Bus stands: 13

Construction
- Structure type: Underground
- Accessible: Yes

Other information
- Station code: 000996 (platform 1A); 000997 (platform 1B); 000998 (platform 1C); 000999 (platform 1D); 001001 (platform 1E); 001002 (platform 1F); 001003 (platform 1G); 001004 (platform 1H); 001010 (platform 2A); 001011 (platform 2B); 001013 (platform 2C); 001009 (platform 3A); 001008 (platform 3B)
- Website: Translink

History
- Opened: 26 March 1988
Location

Queen Street is a bus station operated by Translink. It opened in 1988 and serves the Brisbane central business district. It is an underground station, featuring 3 side platforms, with 13 bus stands. It is located underneath Uptown and Queen Street Mall. It has tunnel connections to Cultural Centre busway station via the Victoria Bridge, and King George Square busway station.

== History ==
The bus station opened on 26 March 1988, and was Brisbane's first underground bus station. It was built alongside the Myer Centre (now Uptown) and below Queen Street Mall.

Upon opening, the platforms were called Kangaroo, Koala, Platypus, and Crocodile. In June 2015, the platforms were renamed with numbers and letters.

== Platforms and services ==
Queen Street platform arrangement
Platform	Stop	Direction	Routes	Notes
1	1A	Northern and southern	100	
1	1B	Northern and southern	330	
1	1C	Northern and southern	150	
1	1D	Northern and southern	140	
1	1E	Northern and southern	130	
1	1F	Northern and southern	61, 134	
1	1G	Northern and southern	385	
1	1H	Northern and southern	345	
2	2A	Eastern and western	200	
2	2B	Eastern and western	453, 454, 460	
2	2C	Eastern and western	205	
3	3A	Southern	180, 183	
3	3B	Southern	119, 129	
