= Ada Driver =

Australian photographer (1868–1954)

Ada Annie Driver
- Born: 12 November 1868; Queensland, Australia
- Died: 22 February 1956 (aged 87); Queensland, Australia
- Years active: 1906–1919
- Known for: Portrait photography
- Spouse: William Ellis Evans (m. 1913)
- Parents: Charles Driver; Harriet Howe

Ada Annie Driver (12 November 1868 – 22 February 1956) was an Australian photographer in Brisbane during the early twentieth century. She ran a photography studio on Queen Street in Brisbane between 1906 and 1919.

== Early life ==
One of eight children, Driver was born on 12 November 1868 to Charles Driver and Harriett Howe in Queensland, Australia. Driver's father Charles was first a cane cutter, before opening a shop.

== Career ==
Driver trained with Danish-born photographer Poul C. Poulson who set up a photographic studio at 7 Queen street in Brisbane, in 1882.

In 1906, Driver opened her own photographic studio, Ada Driver's Studio, at 51 Queen street in Brisbane. She specialised in high-class portraiture, children's portraits, artistic colouring, postcards, and illustrative works. She advertised in The Brisbane Courier that her studio's rooms are the largest in Brisbane, neatly furnished, and use the newest Appliances.

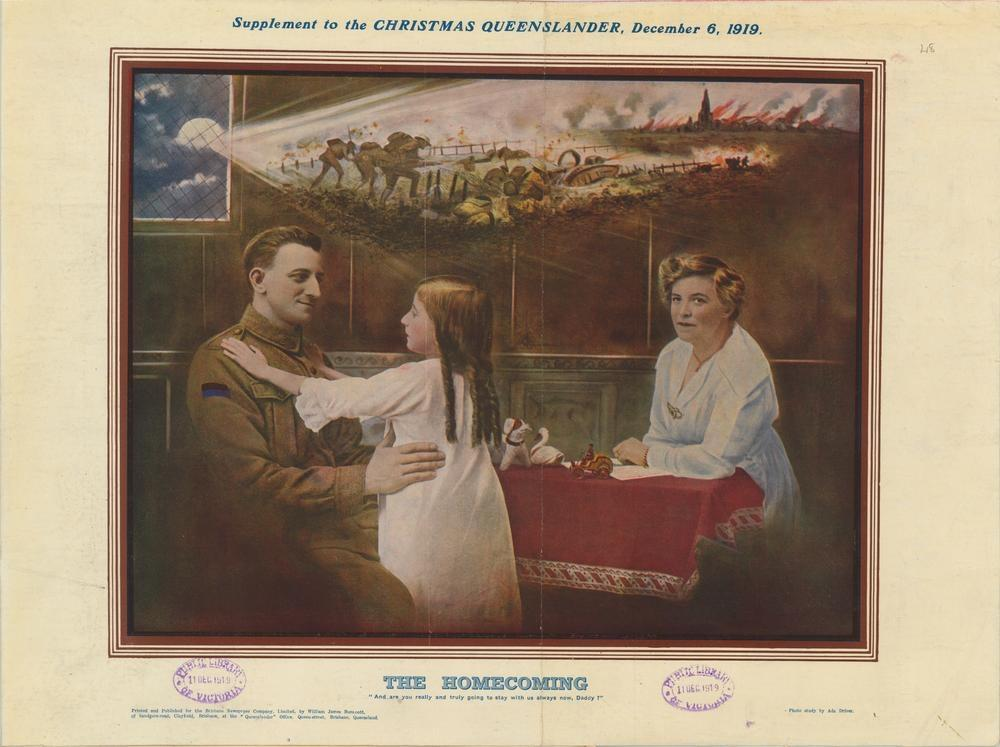
The Homecoming. Photographic study by Ada Driver

Driver's business was successful, allowing her to employ studio assistants who were mostly women, including Lucy, her sister who took over the Ada Driver studios in Fortitude Valley, as well as photographer Elsie Lambton.

Driver also created magic lantern slides and stereoscopic photographs, some of which have been bequeathed to the State Library of Queensland. The Ada Driver studio shut down in 1919.

== Personal life ==
In 1913, Driver married William Ellis Evans, who managed the Queensland branch of Kodak. Driver died on 22 February 1956 and is buried at the Tingalpa Christ Church Cemetery, Queensland, Australia.
