= Queen Street Mall =

Thoroughfare in Brisbane, Australia

Coordinates: 27°28′10.56″S 153°01′30.72″E

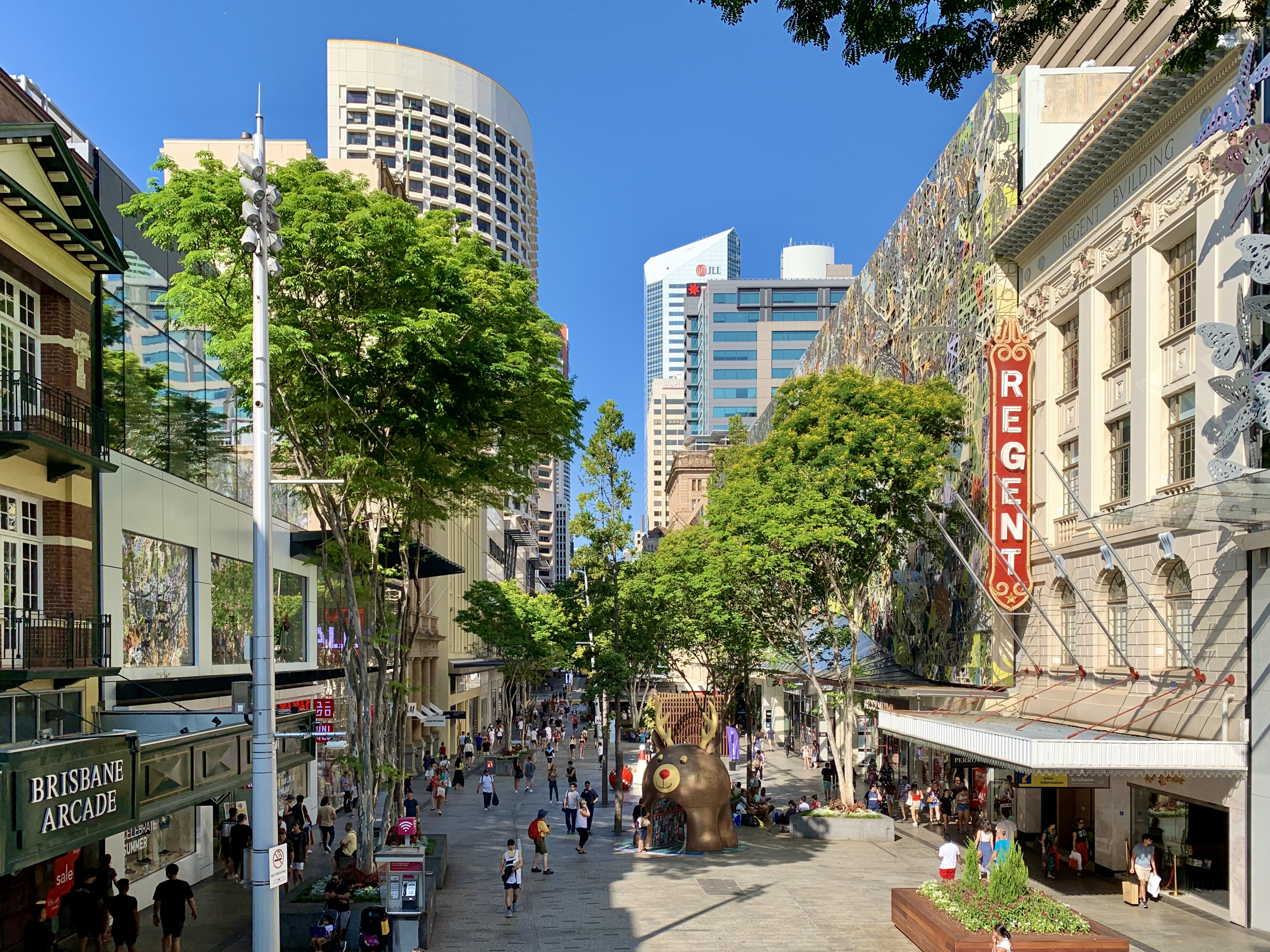
Queen Street Mall

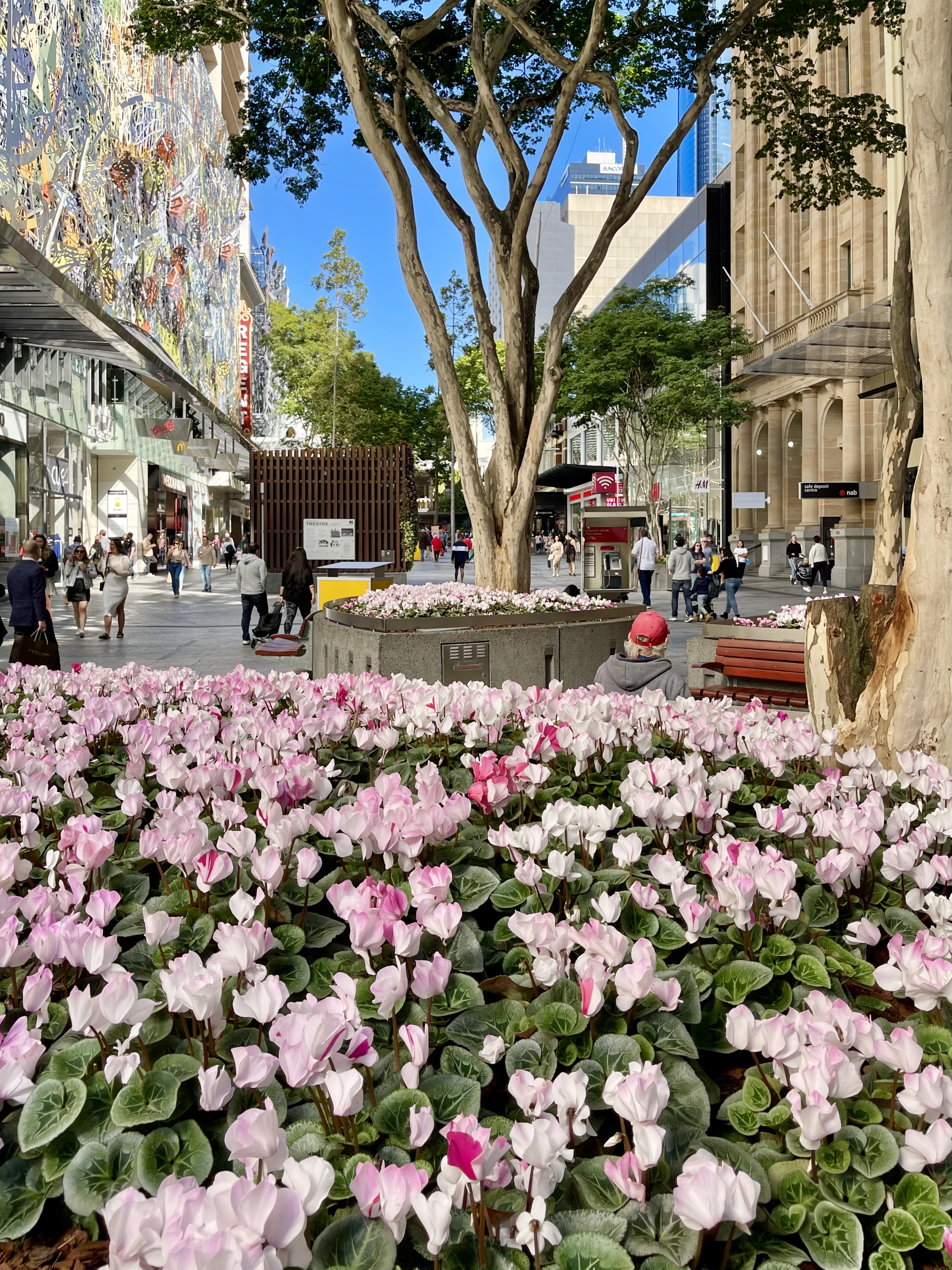
Queen Street Mall, 2021

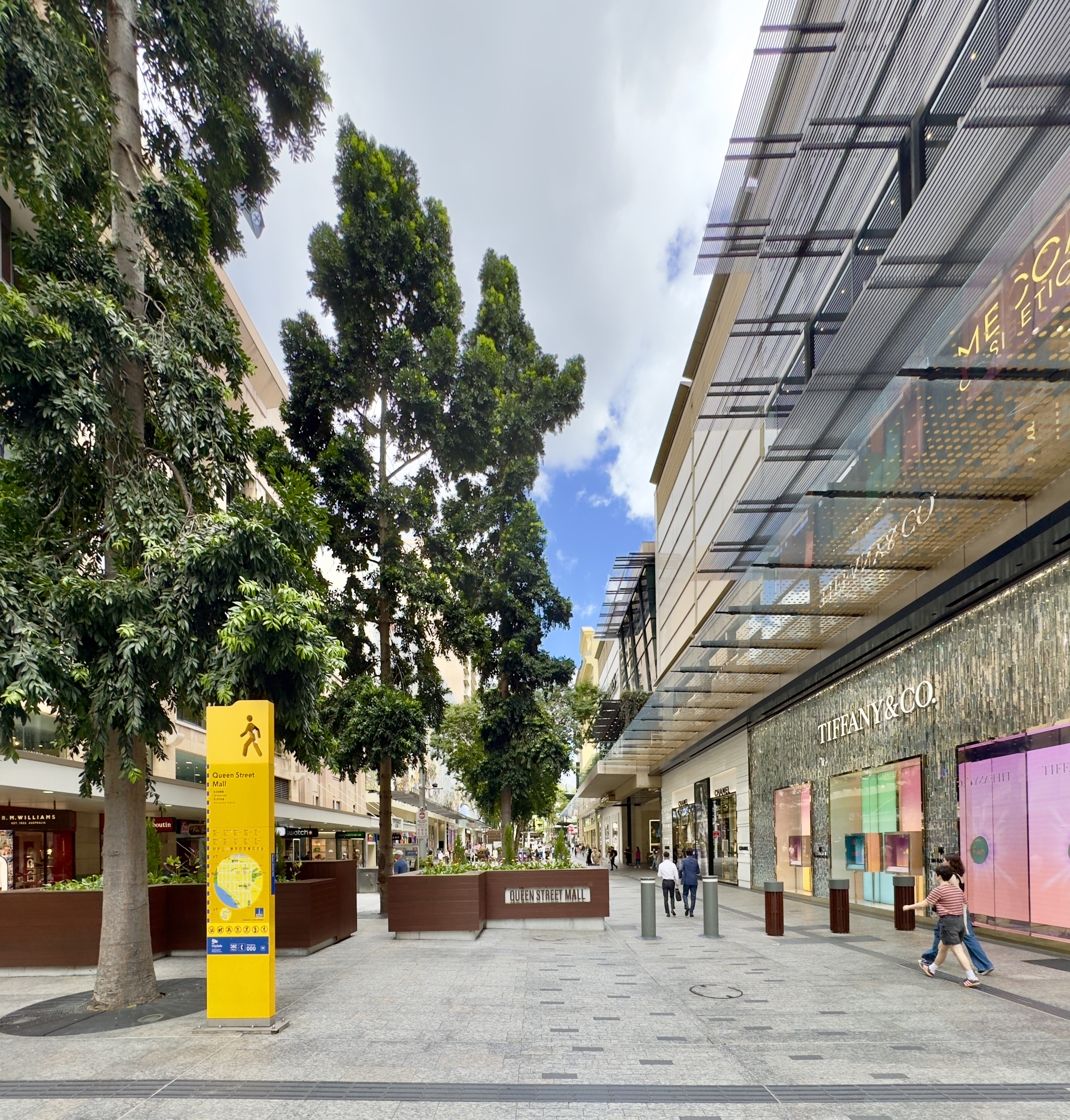
Edward Street entrance to the mall

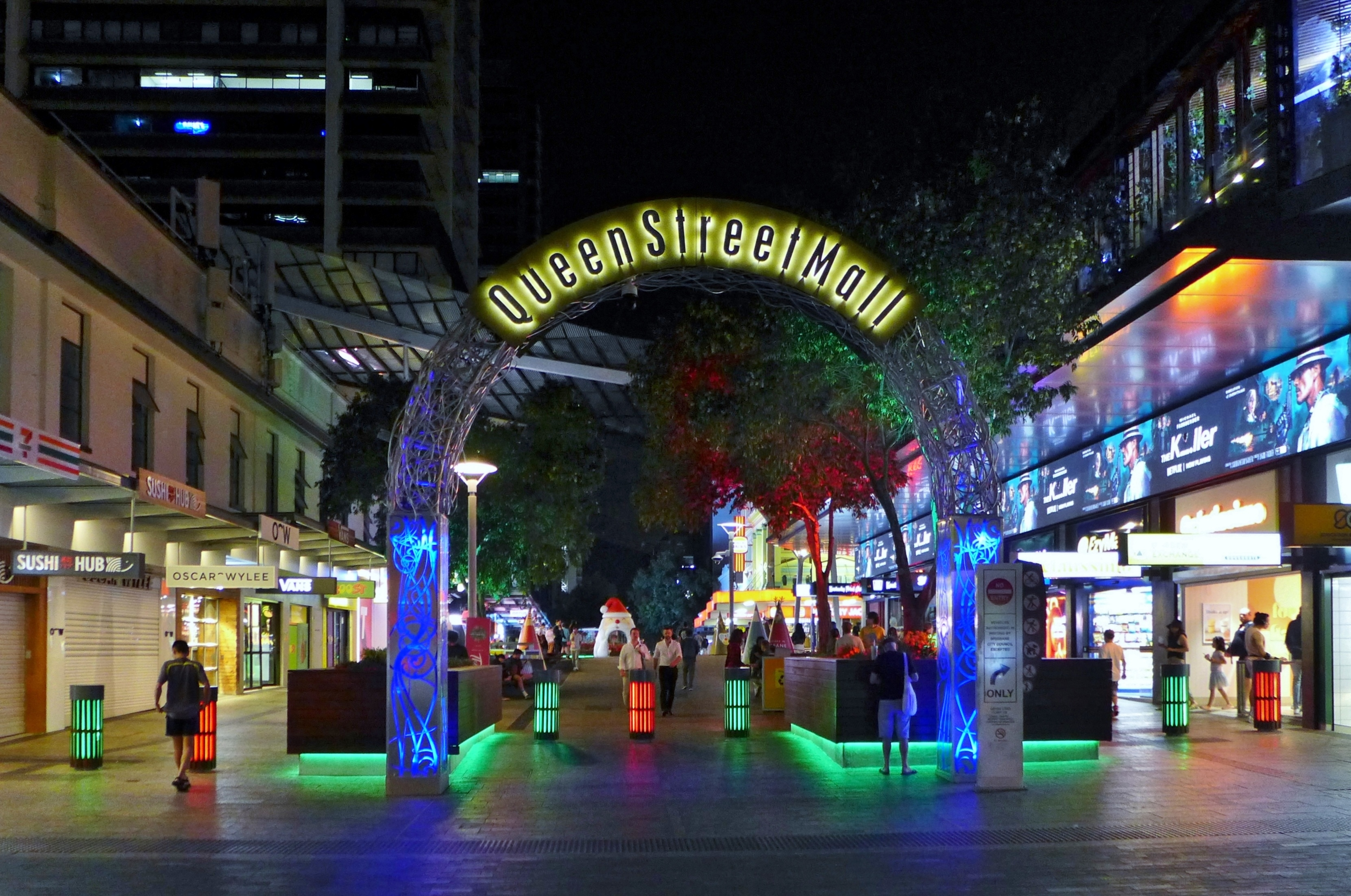
Entrance arch to Queen Street Mall from Albert street

The Queen Street Mall is a pedestrian mall located on Queen Street in Brisbane, Queensland, Australia. The mall extends approximately 500 metres (1,600 ft) from George Street to Edward Street, and has more than 700 retailers over 40,000 square metres (430,000 sq ft) of retail space, which includes six major shopping centres. It was intended to bring more people into the central business district.

The mall was designed by Robin Gibson and opened by Queen Elizabeth II in 1982. It has been refurbished and extended a number of times. It features several shopping centres, as well as pedestrian shade structures and an entertainment stage. The mall sits above the underground Queen Street bus station.

== History ==
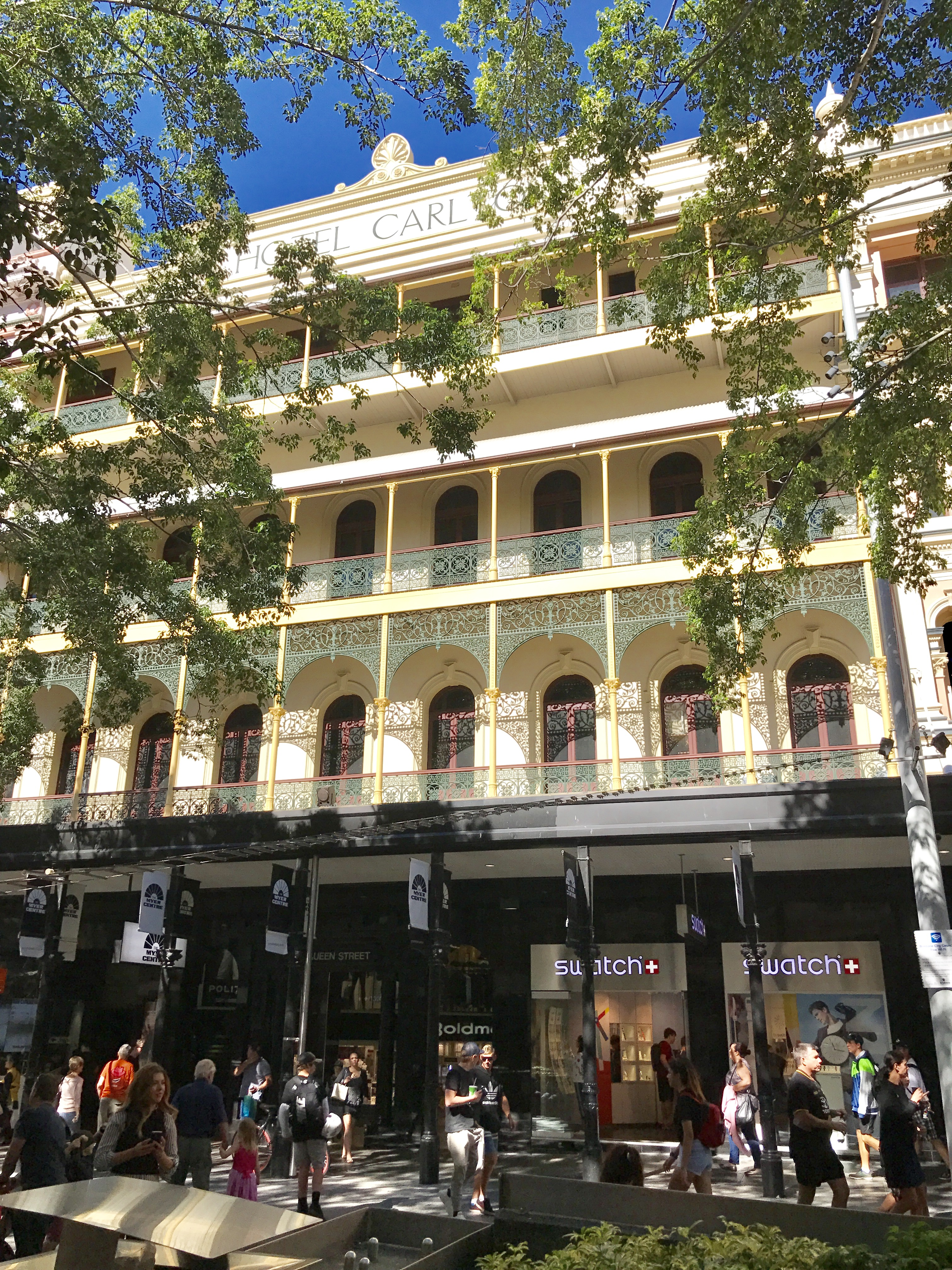
Facadism, such as this example at Uptown, helped to preserve some Victorian era building facades along the Queen Street Mall.

The mall was designed by Robin Gibson. After being closed to traffic in 1981, the initial pedestrian mall was opened by Queen Elizabeth II on 9 August 1982, in order to be ready for the 1982 Commonwealth Games. Initially, the section of Queen Street between Albert Street and Edward Street was partitioned off to form a pedestrian-only retail precinct, and it was then extended in 1988 to include the section of Queen Street between Albert Street and George Street, timed to coincide with Expo '88.

The mall underwent a $25 million refurbishment in 1999, which saw (among other things) the terracotta paving being replaced by granite. The Albert Street section of the mall was refurbished again in 2007. The Brisbane City Council announced in 2009 that Burnett Lane, a narrow laneway that runs between George Street and Albert Street, and parallel to the mall, would be refurbished and integrated into the Queen Street Mall precinct.

=== 2013 siege ===
On 8 March 2013, the mall was the scene of a 90 minute siege. The offender, Lee Matthew Hillier, had a long criminal history. He was shot several times with non-lethal rounds, ending the incident. He pled guilty to charges including assaulting police and going armed to cause fear. In January 2014 he was sentenced to 4 1/2 years in jail.

== Features ==
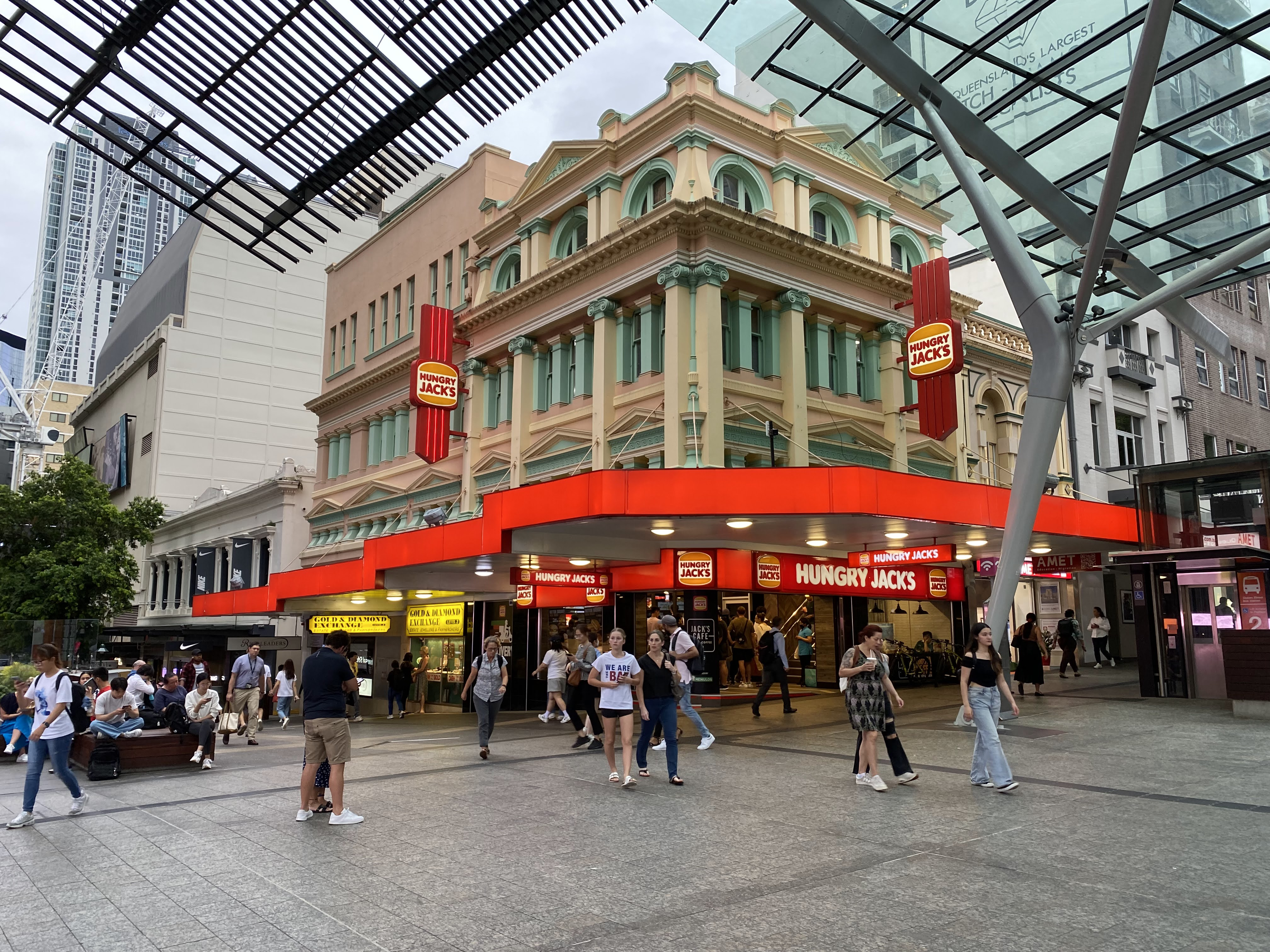
Intersection of Queen Street and Albert Street, 2023

There are a number of shopping centres located in the Queen Street Mall, including:

- Wintergarden (opened 1982)
- Uptown (opened 1988 as the Myer Centre)
- QueensPlaza (opened 2005)
- Brisbane Arcade (opened 1923)

At the intersection of Queen Street and Albert Street at the centre of the mall is a 15-metre-high (49 ft) steel structure designed to provide shade and cover from the weather. An entertainment stage for music, model shows, and other performances is situated near the George Street end of the mall, between Uptown and the Queen Adelaide Building. The stage is covered by an 11-metre-high (36 ft) roof.

Underneath the Queen Street Mall is the Queen Street bus station.

In the development of stage one and stage two of the mall, significant heritage-listed building facades were preserved, giving the mall a restored yesteryear feeling.

== Shopping centres ==
There are several significant shopping centres located on the Queen Street Mall. These include the Wintergarden (opened in 1982), Uptown (opened in 1988, formerly the Myer Centre), Broadway on the Mall (opened in 1989, closed 2013) and the lavish Queens Plaza, situated at the northern end of the mall, which was opened in two stages, the first in 2005, and the second in 2008.

The Wintergarden is a three level shopping centre with over 70 specialty stores including a gymnasium, ten pin bowling alley, luxury Hilton hotel, H&M, Zara, Uniqlo and RM Williams. In November 2009, it was announced that the Wintergarden would undergo a $100 million refurbishment in two 12-month stages.

Uptown is the Brisbane CBD's largest shopping centre. It features 130 stores spread across six floors including Coles, Target and Event Cinemas. Not long after Myer departure, co-owner Vicinity Centres chief executive Peter Huddle revealed plans for the sites future.

QueensPlaza is the Brisbane CBD's most upmarket shopping centre. It has around 80 stores on three levels including Australia's largest single location David Jones department store.

There are other smaller shopping centres and arcades on the Queen Street Mall. These include the historic Brisbane Arcade, the Q&A Building and the heritage Tattersall's Arcade.

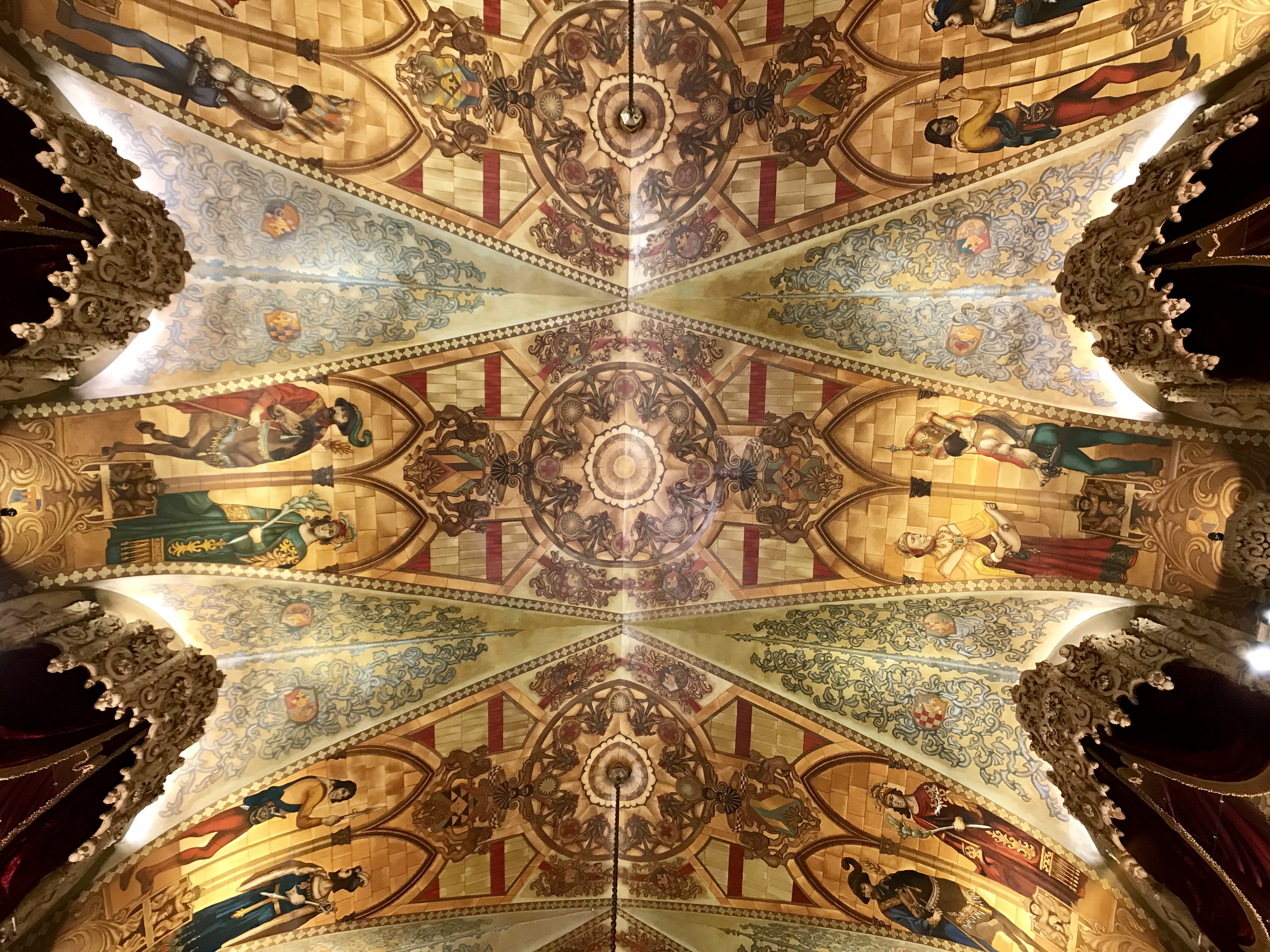
The Regent Theatre foyer ceiling

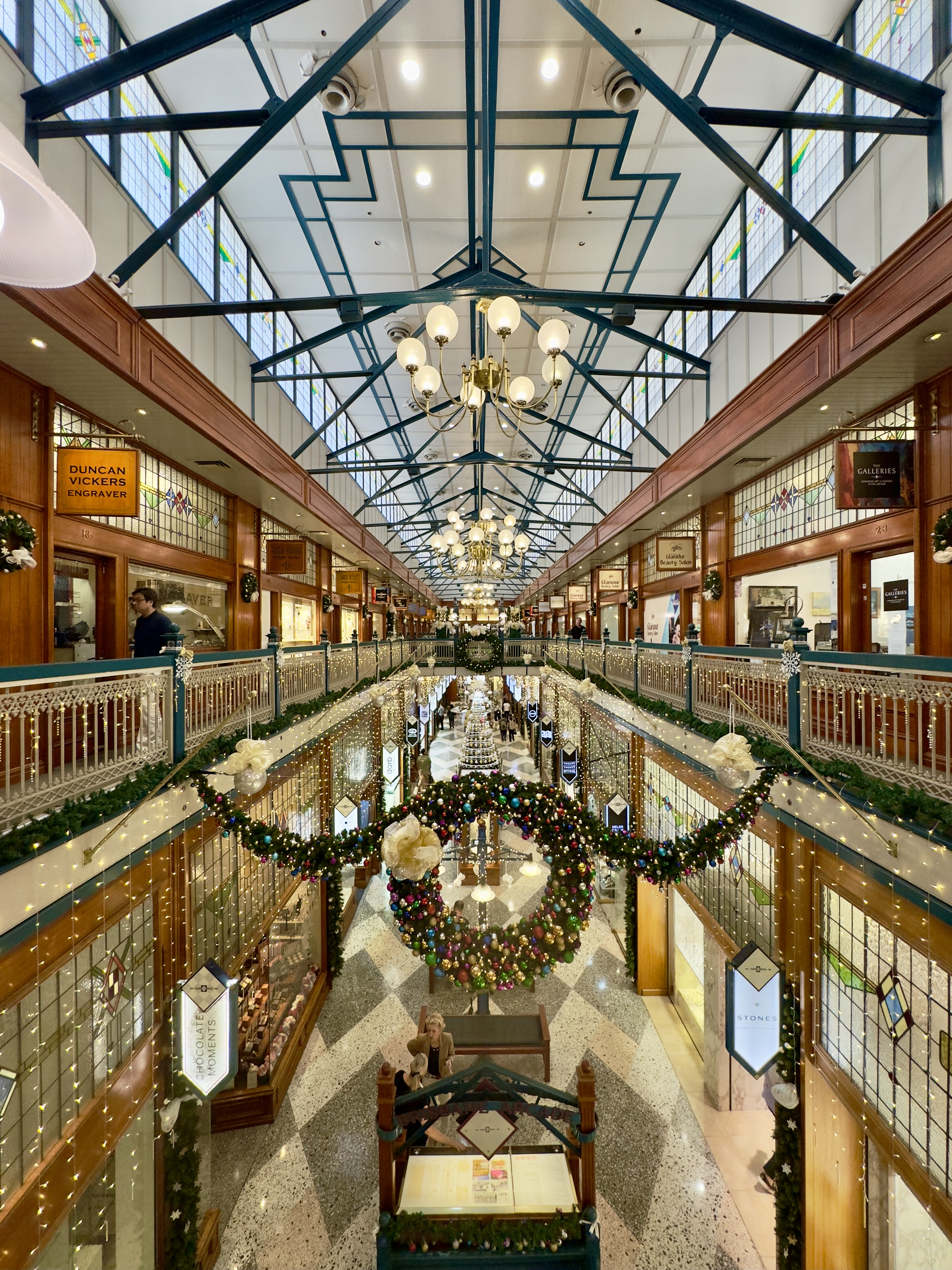
Christmas decorations in the Brisbane Arcade, 2023

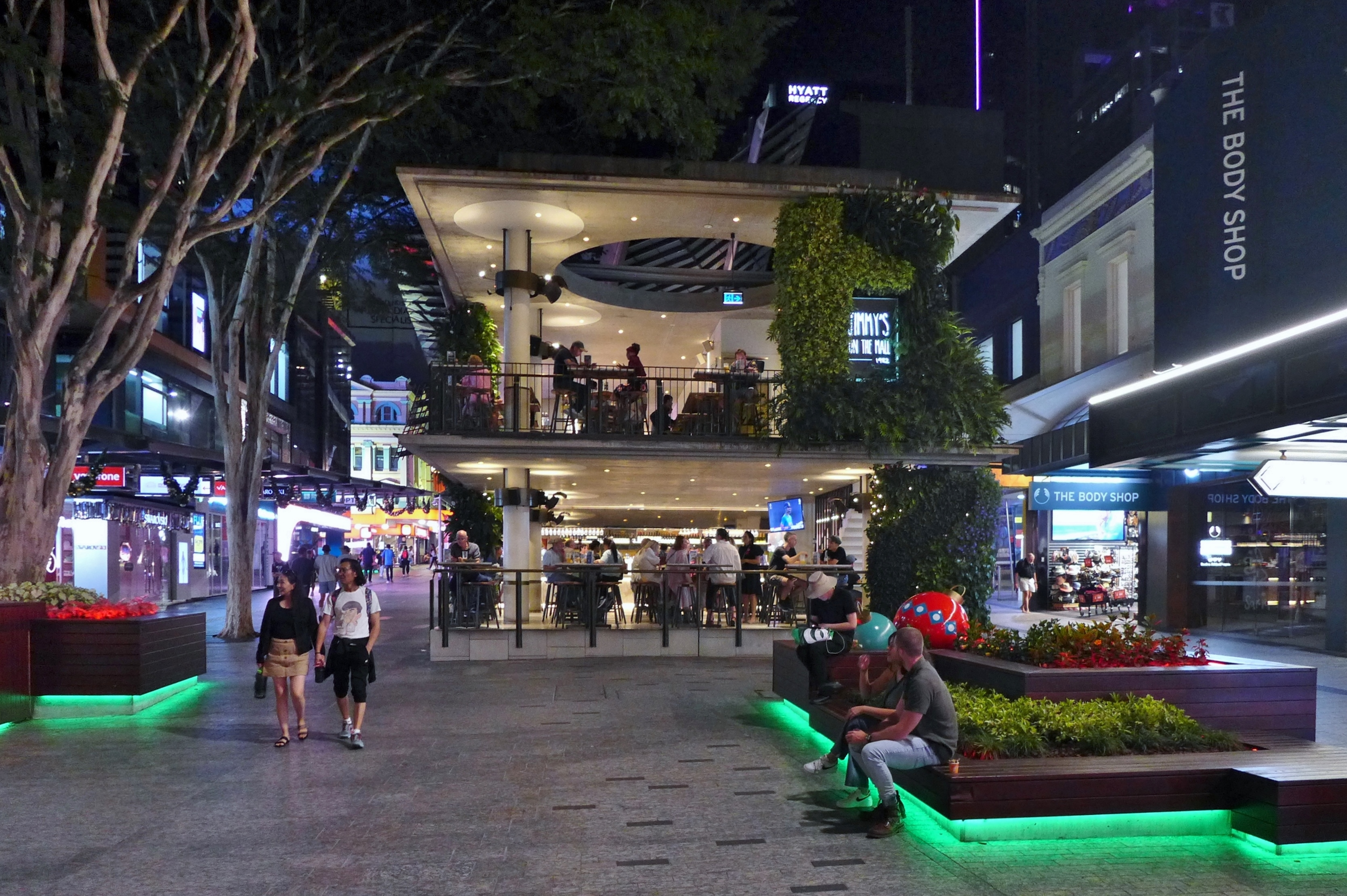
Jimmy's on the Mall, 2023

== Refurbishment ==
The mall also underwent refurbishment in 1999 from its signature terracotta tile footpath to a grey slate tile footpath, with several significant art commissions and new tree and shrub enclosures (with bench seating) throughout.

== Further developments ==
In 2006, the other end of the George Street engagement with the Mall ('top of the Mall') saw the opening of Brisbane Square which further extended the grey slate tile rendering of the Mall, and, in 2008 extension of the Mall along Albert Street to the corner of Albert Street and Adelaide Street.

The Brisbane City Council announced in 2009 that Burnett Lane, a narrow laneway that runs between George Street and Albert Street, and parallel to the Mall, will be integrated into the Queen Street Mall precinct with a boutique bar/restaurant area proposed.

In March 2023, Myer, Millanos and Pig & Whistle were evicted to allow for preparation works for redevelopment of Uptown and the Queen Street Mall. Myer closed its Queen Street store in July 2023 with Pig & Whistle closing in the following September. This comes ahead of the redevelopment which is expected to commence in early 2024.

== Management ==
Management of the mall was originally covered by the Local Government (Queen Street Mall) Act 1981 (Qld), until it was repealed and replaced by the City of Brisbane Act 2010 (Qld).
