= Broadway on the Mall =

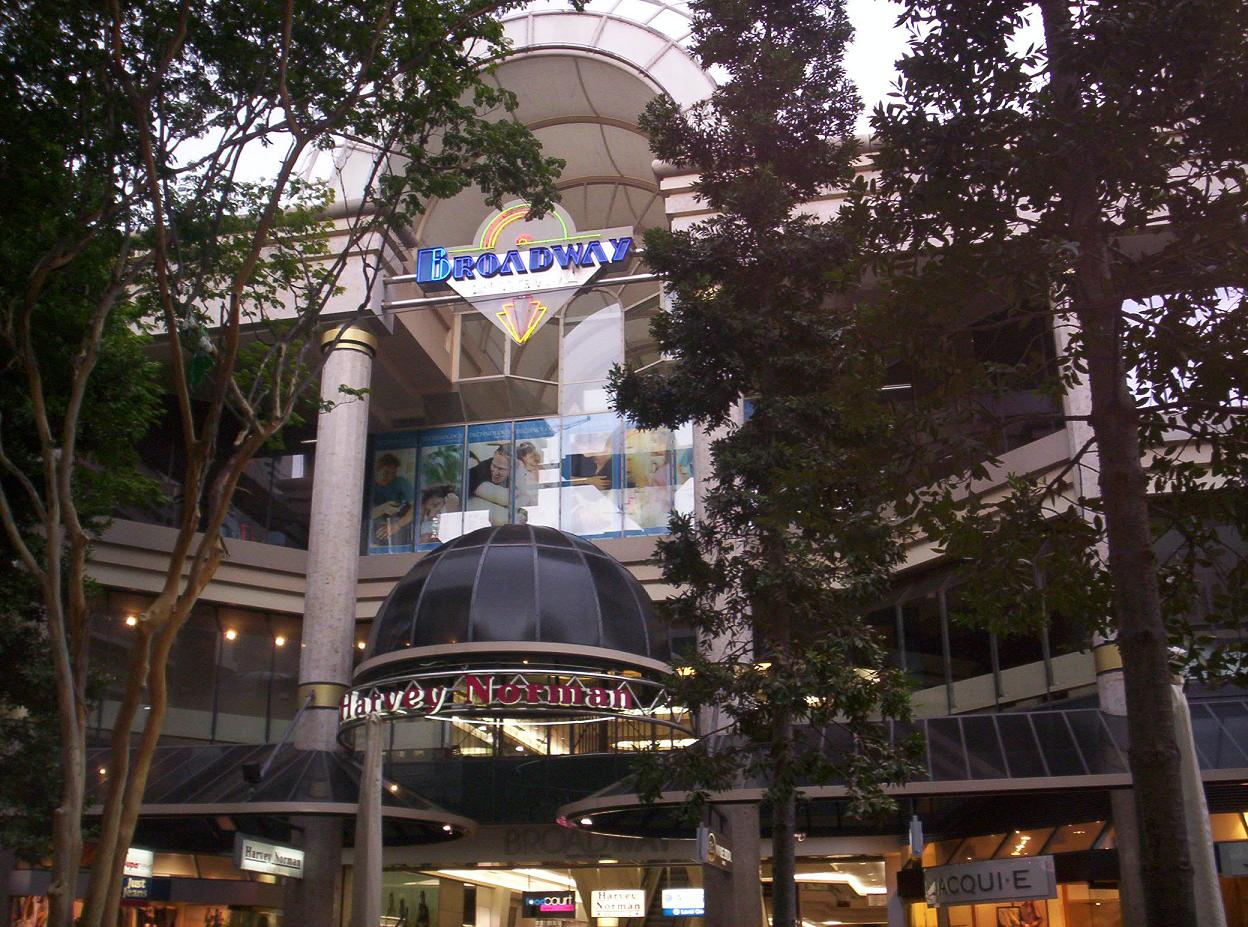
- Broadway on the Mall entrance from the Queen Street Mall
- Location: Brisbane, Queensland, Australia
- Coordinates: 27°28′07.38″S 153°01′31.93″E
- Opened: Early 1990s
- Closed: August 31, 2013
- Manager: JLL
- Owner: Industry Superannuation Property Trust

Broadway on the Mall was a four-storey shopping mall, located in Brisbane, Queensland, Australia, between the Queen Street Mall and Adelaide Street in the Brisbane central business district.

It was developed by Mace Developments and Jennings Industries in the late 1980s.

Following the collapse of AVJennings and a series of acquisitions, the centre has been owned by Industry Superannuation Property Trust since 2011.

In 2011, the centre conducted a search for a fashion blogger to represent them on social media.

On 31 August 2013, the centre closed to allow for a redevelopment of the tired retail space to commence. Broadway on the Mall was expected to reopen in mid-to-late 2014 as "170 Queen Street", but due to construction delays and torrential rain, the project has been delayed.

== Fire at Broadway on the Mall ==
On 20 January 2015, a large fire started in the construction site of Broadway on the Mall, and as a result, destroyed a portion of the existing building and air conditioning system, where the fire was reported to have started. Photos of the blaze flew around social media. This therefore further put back the finish date of the renovations at the mall.

== Building today ==
Today, the building has been partially demolished and converted into a three-storey, mixed usage retail store, home to a number of prominent fashion retailers, such as Uniqlo and H&M.
