= Uptown, Brisbane =

Uptown
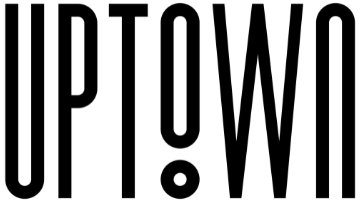

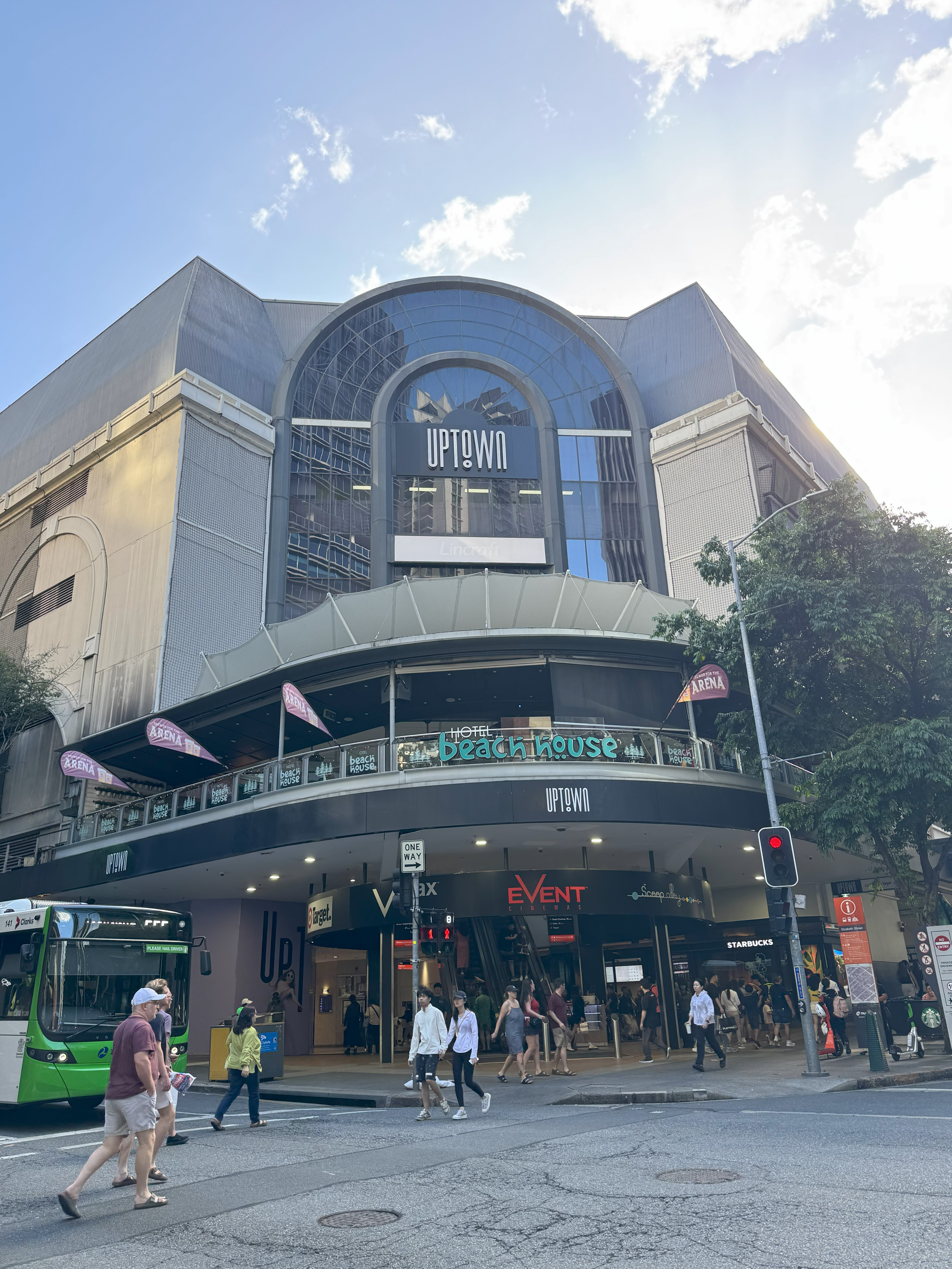
- Entrance to Uptown on the corner of Albert and Elizabeth Streets in April 2025
- Location: Brisbane, Queensland, Australia
- Coordinates: 27°28′14″S 153°01′29″E
- Address: 91 Queen St, Brisbane CBD QLD 4000
- Opened: 28 March 1988; 38 years ago
- Developer: Vicinity Centres
- Owner: Vicinity Centres
- Num. of stores: 115
- Num. of anchor tenants: 3
- Floor area: 63,025 m^{2} (678,395 sq ft)
- Floors: 9
- Parking: 1,450 spaces
- Public transit: Queen Street bus station
- Website: www.uptownbrisbane.com.au

Uptown, previously known as The Myer Centre, is a shopping centre in the Brisbane central business district. It is located on the Queen Street Mall.

== Transport ==
Uptown is one of the bus transit hubs for the Brisbane CBD. Many bus routes commence and terminate under Uptown at the Queen Street bus station on the Albert Street level of the complex.

Uptown has a multi-level car park with 1,450 spaces.

== Layout ==
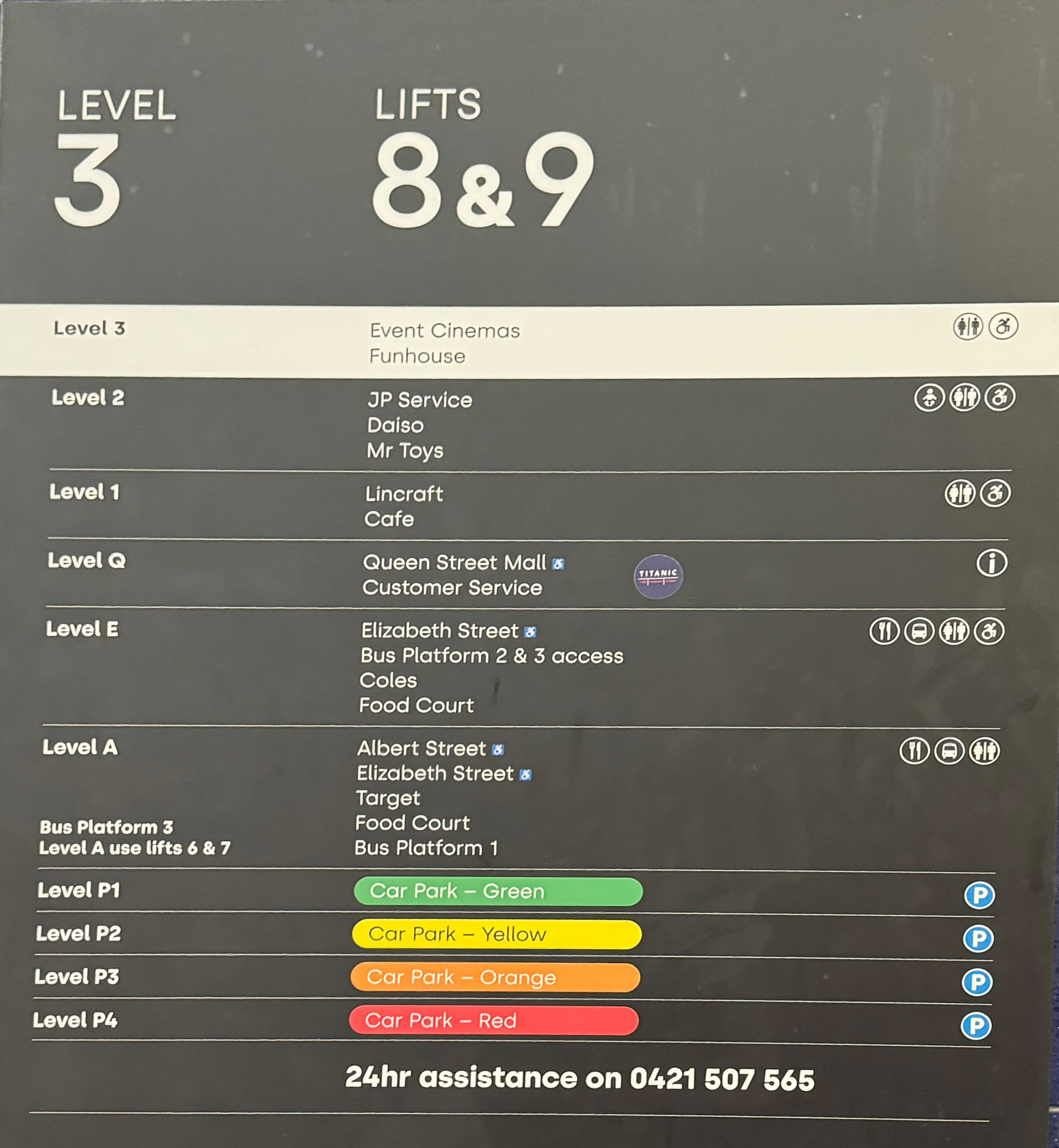
Signage of all the levels of Uptown

Uptown is built into the sloping terrain of the Brisbane CBD, with entrances connecting to different internal levels from surrounding streets. Retail floors are arranged above and between these access points and are linked by internal lifts and escalators, with the centre’s cinema complex, operated by Event Cinemas, located on an upper level. The Queen Street bus station is integrated into the building at the Albert Street frontage, providing direct public transport access into the centre.

== History ==
=== 20th Century ===
==== Origins ====
Myer Centre was built on land that was originally occupied by Hotel Carlton, New York Hotel, Telegraph Building, and the Barry and Roberts department store.

Hotel Carlton was built in 1891 and was located on the corner of Queen and Elizabeth Streets. It was redeveloped in the 1920s and closed in 1985.

Next door to Hotel Carlton was the Telegraph News Company which was built in 1891 and operated until 1963 when it relocated to Bowen Hills. The building had been refurbished and was taken over for use as an office by Queensland Newspapers City which the building was renamed Newspaper House.

The New York Hotel was originally built in 1866 as a shop and dwelling of a well-known butcher, James Collins. It was later repurposed as the European Hotel, which renamed in 1902 to the York Hotel. In 1928 it purchased by a brewer Castlemaine Perkins who demolished the building and built a new three storey hotel known as the New York Hotel which opened in 1929. The hotel excluding the fine upper façade was demolished in 1986.

The Barry & Roberts department store building was built in 1921 and featured a department store, grocery store and the company's head office. This store had frontages on both Queen and Elizabeth Streets with the Elizabeth Street level being one floor lower than the Queen Street level. Barry & Roberts was sold to Condraulics Pty Limited (a subsidiary of Industrial Equity Limited) on 11 December 1985. The building excluding the facade was demolished in 1986.

==== Mid 1980s: Construction ====
Construction of Myer Centre started in late 1986 and required the excavation of 375,000 cubic metres of earth, to a depth of 22 metres (eight metres below the Brisbane River level), which was the largest urban excavation in Australia at the time.

The Myer Centre developed by the Remm Group Property Limited on the block of land on Queen and Elizabeth Streets. Remm Group Property Limited sold the $385 million development to Chase Corp (Aust) Ltd. during the construction phase for $470 million. Using facadism, the facades of four historic buildings previously located on the site were retained and restored. The historic facades of the Hotel Carlton, New York Hotel, Newspaper House, and the Barry and Roberts department store were restored and retained. The interior design emphasised a Victorian theme, utilising ornate railing and fittings in brass and green, with terrazzo floor tiles.

==== Late 1980s: Opening ====
The Myer Centre opened on 28 March 1988 just prior to Brisbane's World Expo '88. The centre features an underground carpark with 1,450 spaces and access to the Queen Street Bus Station. Above the carpark features nine levels of retail with 180 stores and a large five level Myer department store which was the largest in the state. Myer was previous located in the Allan and Stark Building on Queen Street prior to its relocation to The Myer Centre.

The Myer Centre featured an eight screen Hoyts Cinema and a food court on level A with a McDonald's, KFC and Pizza Hut on level A, a food court on level E and two taverns in the basement area. Bertie's Tavern was located in the basement area fronting Elizabeth Street. It hosted "The Funkyard", a nightspot with an emphasis on the "alternative" guitar rock of the era. Metropolis Tavern was located in the basement area fronting Queen Street and featured the "Metropolis" nightclub. The Funkyard closed in early 1992 and Metropolis closed in 1993. The Funkyard spot was replaced by Sizzler which opened on 26 October 1992.

On the top level of The Myer Centre featured a fun park known as Tops. Tops comprised various small shops, an amusement centre, a swing ship, a dragon train, and a Ferris wheel.

==== 1990s ====
In September 1990 the centre's owner Interchase Corporation Ltd announced a June year loss of $114.3 million with the value of the centre written down from its height of $495 million in June 1988 to $327 million. By April 1991 two administrators took control of the centre after the collapse of Interchase Corporation with estimated debts of more than $280 million. In April 1992 a group of private investors purchased the centre for $207 million.

In November 1998 the Myer Centre was purchased by Gandel Retail Trust for $371 million, making it the second largest property transaction in Australia's history at that time.

=== 21st Century ===
==== 2000s ====
In August 2000 Gandel Retail Trust announced a $30 million redevelopment of The Myer Centre. This included the addition of a Coles Express supermarket, which was later rebranded as Coles Central.

In October 2000 Tops closed down to make way for a cinema complex. During that month around 20,000 people attended the farewell free rides.

In April 2001 Kerry Packer sought approval from Australian Competition and Consumer Commission to establish a joint cinema complex with Amalgamated Holdings’ Greater Union on the former space of Tops.

On 15 November 2001 the Greater Union-Hoyts Cinema complex opened on the top level of the centre. The opening of the cinema complex resulted in the closure of the Hoyts Cinema on Level A and two Greater Union complexes in Albert Street. Greater Union controlled 3 screens whilst Hoyts controlled 5 screens of the complex. In 2005 the complex was taken over by Birch, Carroll & Coyle which was rebranded to Event Cinemas in 2010.

In 2002 the Target discount department store opened in the former space of the Hoyts cinema on level A.

In October 2002 Gandel Retail Trust merged with Colonial First State to form CFS Gandel.

In 2006, Colonial First State acquired 25% stake of the centre as part of the merger with of Gandel Retail Trust.

In July 2007, the Sizzler restaurant had closed down with the stairs being removed and replaced with a sushi kiosk in 2008. The underground restaurant was replaced by a storage area and a small reconfiguration of the carpark.

==== 2010s ====
On 26 March 2012 ISPT Core Fund purchased a 50% stake of The Myer Centre for $366 million with the centre valued at $732 million.

On 3 November 2014, CFS Retail Property Trust was renamed to Novion Property Group and in June 2015 Novion Property Group merged with Federation Limited to form Vicinity Centres. This resulted in Vicinity Centres having the final 25% ownership of The Myer Centre. In September 2016 Vicinity Centres sold 25% stake to ISPT resulting in 25% ownership from Vicinity Centres and 75% from ISPT.

==== 2020s ====
On 16 March 2023, Myer announced that after being unable to reach a commercial agreement with the landlord, it would not be renewing its lease, thus ending 35 years of continuous operation at the site in July 2023. Myer CEO John King said it would close its doors at the end of July but was not turning its back on the CBD. The Myer store permanently closed on 31 July 2023.

After the departure of Myer, The Myer Centre was rebranded to Uptown on 1 August 2023. Vicinity Centres and ISPT are in the talks of planning a $500 million redevelopment of the complex and have investigated a number of options for the centre including a downsized contemporary department store and plans without a department store. Vicinity CEO Peter Huddle said “We essentially have a large retail redevelopment planned for there which is retail, leisure, food and beverage plus entertainment”. Works on the potential $500 million redevelopment were not likely to begin until the 2024–25 financial year. He also indicated the plans will include an aquarium, escape room, arcade, laser tag arena and indoor ski-field.

On 5 April 2024, it was revealed that Australia's first Dopamine land an interactive multisensory experience museum would open on the Level Q half of the former Myer store. Dopamine Land opened on 28 May 2024.

On 19 July 2024, the Titanic. The Human Story opened on the Level Q half of the former Myer store next to Dopamine Land. This exhibition featured over 200 artifacts and personal items from Titanic passengers and crew and took visitors through the history and legacy of the most infamous ship of all time. This exhibition ended on 20 April 2025.

On 8 July it was revealed that ISPT were looking into selling their 75% ownership of Uptown for the past 12 months. However, despite some interest no buyer has been found.

As of 31 July 2025, two years after Myer closed, the centre has shown signs of reduced activity, particularly on the upper levels, where many shop fronts remain vacant. The food court continues to attract steady patronage, but customer numbers and retail offerings decrease on the higher floors. The centre previously housed 122 stores before Myer's departure and had a peak count of 230 stores; by August 2025, the number had declined to 115. Although a $500 million redevelopment was announced for the 2024-25 financial year, no work has commenced, and the centre's condition has remained largely unchanged.

== Tenants ==
Uptown has 63,025m² of floor space. The major retailers include Target, Coles, Beach House Bar & Grill, Dopamine Land, Funhouse and Event Cinemas.

== Incidents and controversy ==
- On August 1994, a Brisbane City Council bus driver ejected a university student from a bus and punched and pushed him against a glass door of The Myer Centre after he accused the student of not having a valid bus ticket and refused to leave the bus. A bus inspector was present and did not intervene, so police were called. This incident was witnessed by at least six people. The student was left with bruises, headaches and a swollen finger.
- On 2 November 1997, after three weeks of controversy The Myer Centre was forced to backflip its policy of kicking out customers because of their race, colour, dress or hairstyle due to incidents of shoplifting from a group of youths a few years back. Around 100 protesters walked through the centre chanting: “Shame Myer, Shame!’’.
- On 10 August 2001, serial pest Peter Hore interrupted a lingerie launch hosted by supermodel Sarah O’Hare inside Myer by leaping on to the stage whilst she addressed to the audience. Myer security pounced on Hore who was dressed in army fatigues and holding a didgeridoo and evicted him from the store.
- On 1 April 2005, a 64-year-old woman was stabbed inside a Sizzler restaurant by her 36-year-old son during an attempted murder because wanted to kill his mother because he believed she had mistreated him as a child. The woman ended up in a critical but stable condition in hospital and survived. She suffered multiple stab wounds to the head, face and upper body and doctors could not save one of her eyes. Several bystanders tried to restrain the man, but he managed to escape before police arrived. The man fled to Northern New South Wales but handed himself into Tweed Heads police station a few days later upon hearing his mother had survived the attack. The man was sentenced to 12 years in jail for the attempted murder.
- Nearly a year later that same Sizzler restaurant became a scene to another incident after rat poison was discovered inside the salad bars on 25 March 2006. A female customer told staff she found the substance in her soup and fortunately no one was reportedly ill. A 57 year old woman who turned out to be mentally unstable had been charged over the contamination of salad bars at the Sizzler restaurants in Toowong and The Myer Centre. As a result over the two rat poison incidents Sizzler was forced to shut down its salad bars nationwide.
- On 8 March 2013, the front of The Myer Centre was the scene of an hour-long siege. The gunman made his way down from The Myer Centre to a Hungry Jack's outlet on Queen Street Mall. Nearby shops and restaurants were either evacuated or locked down. The dramatic stand-off ended when the man pointed a handgun to his own neck before he aimed it at three elderly people sitting on a bench. The 34-year-old gunman was subdued by police using rubber bullets and taken to Royal Brisbane Hospital in an ambulance accompanied by an armed officer from the Special Emergency Response Team.
- On 5 April 2017, a burst water main from the Queen Street Bus Station flooded the bus station and parts of The Myer Centre above. Most of the centre was able to reopen at around 8:30am that day. However, some stores on level A remains closed due to the flood. The bus station was reopened at 2:30pm in time for the afternoon peak services.

== Gallery ==
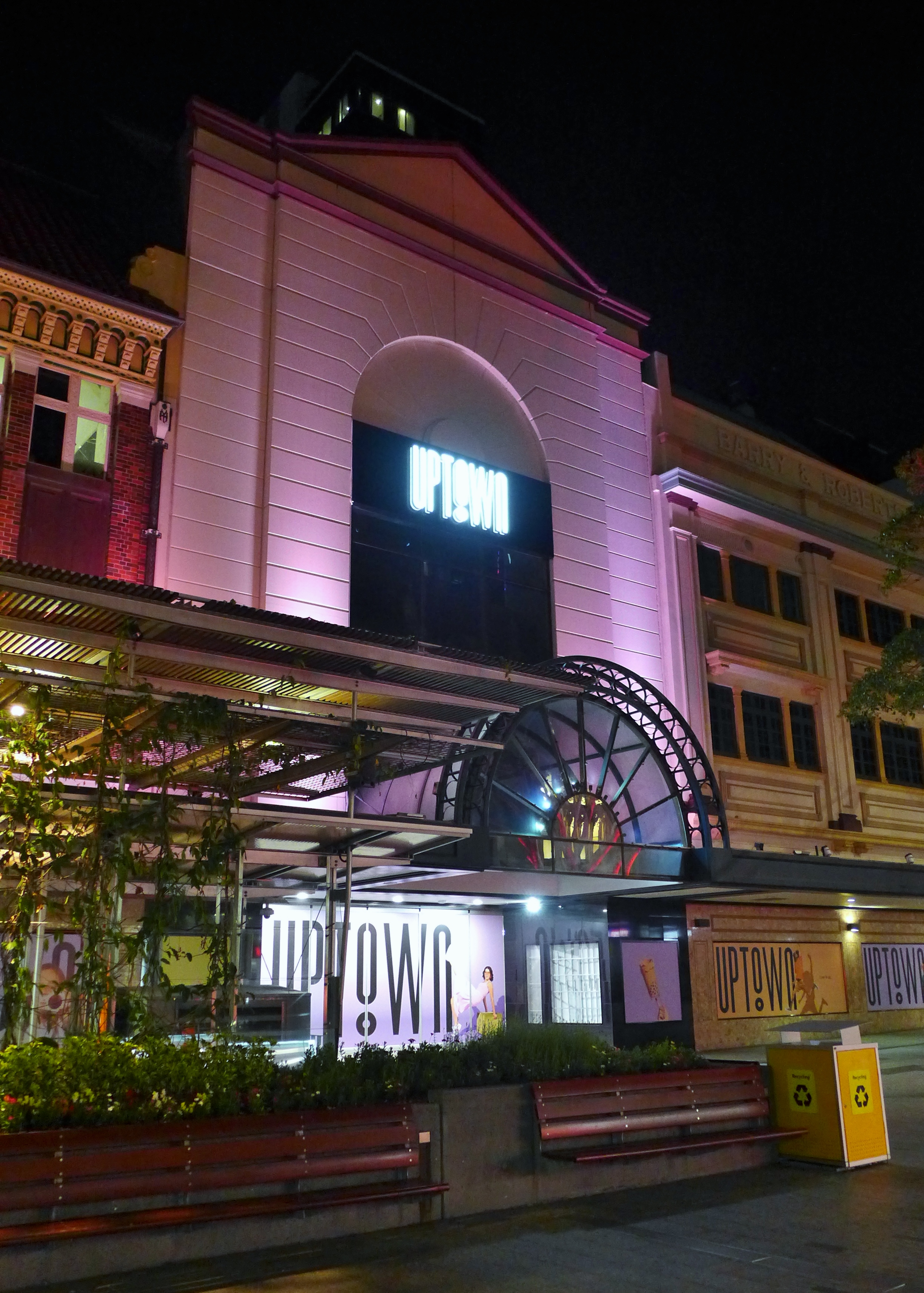
View of Uptown at night on Queen Street Mall

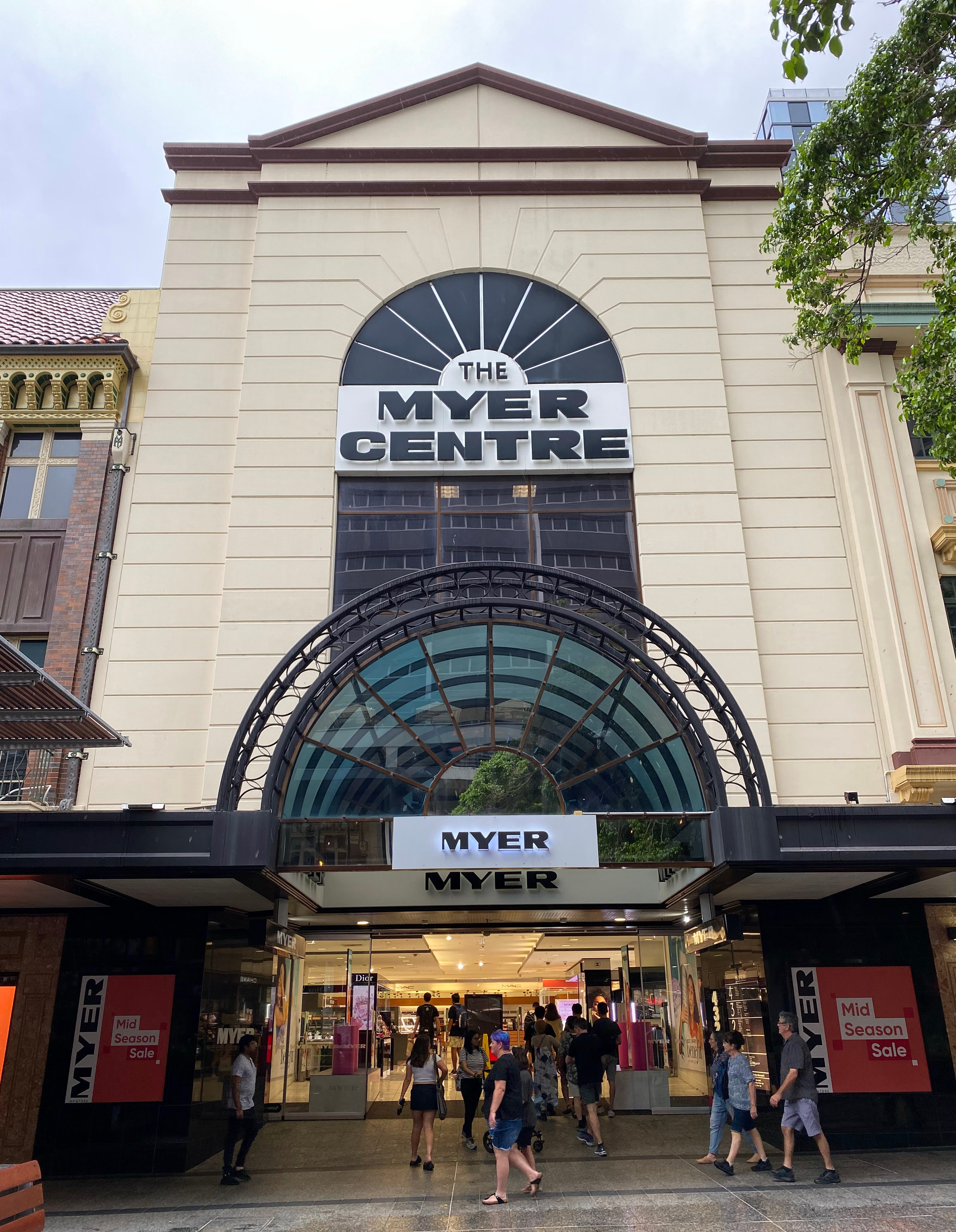
Entrance to Myer on Queen Street Mall

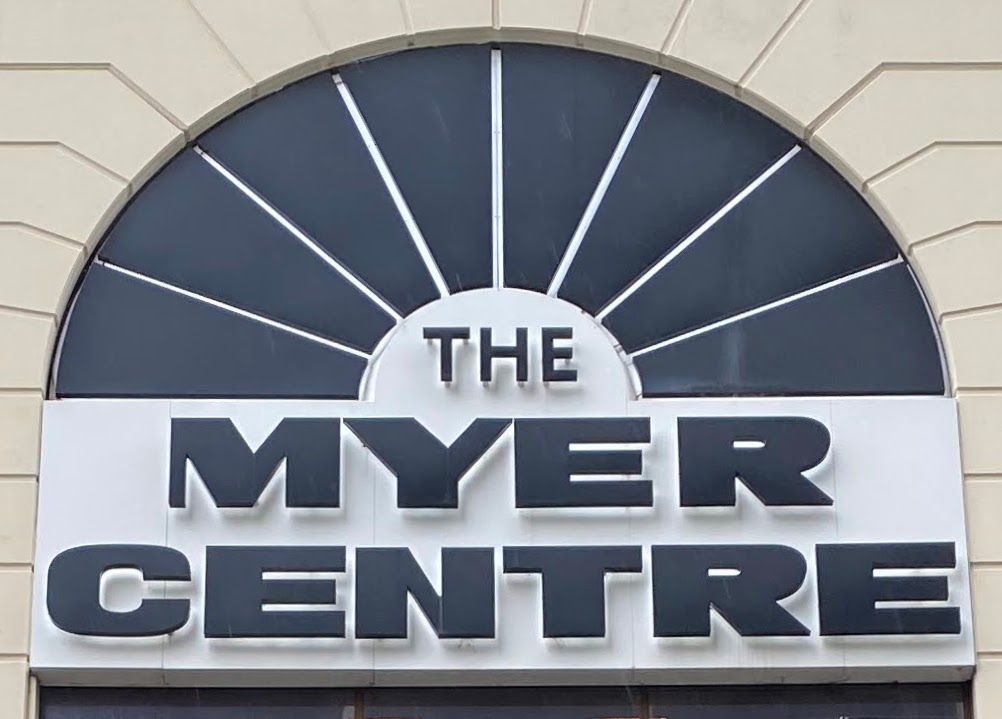
Old Myer Centre sign

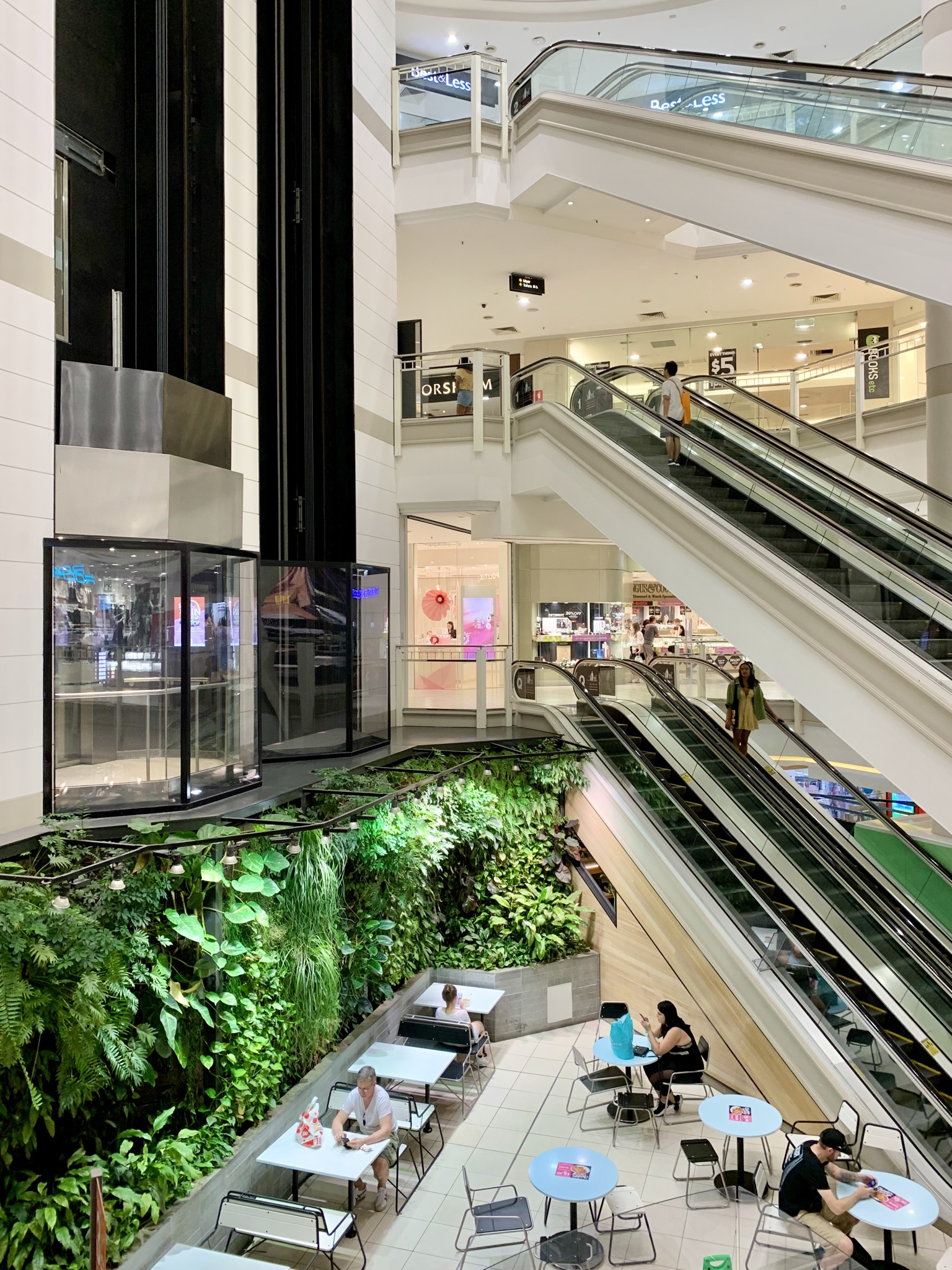
Food court atrium

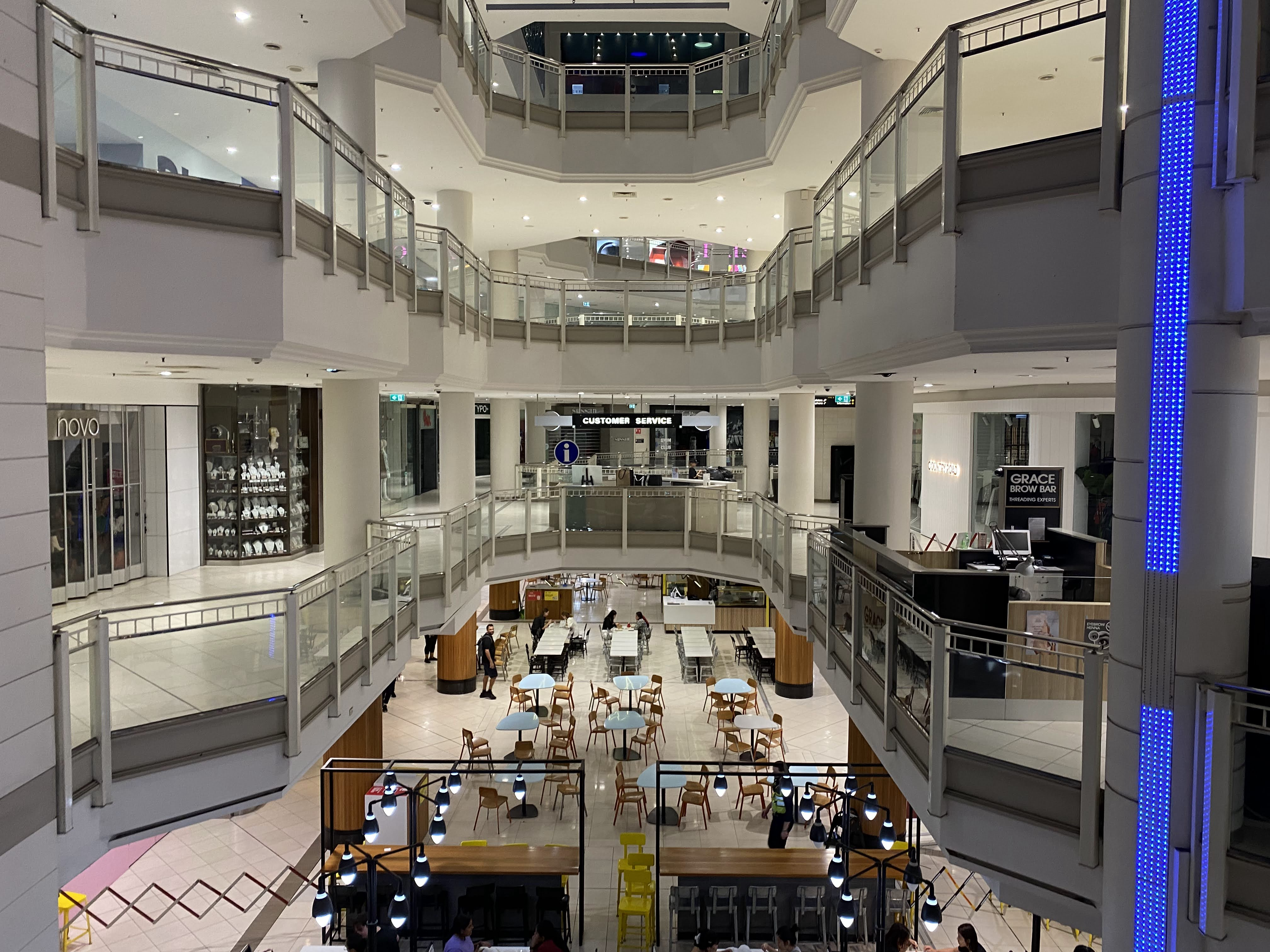
View of the food court and levels

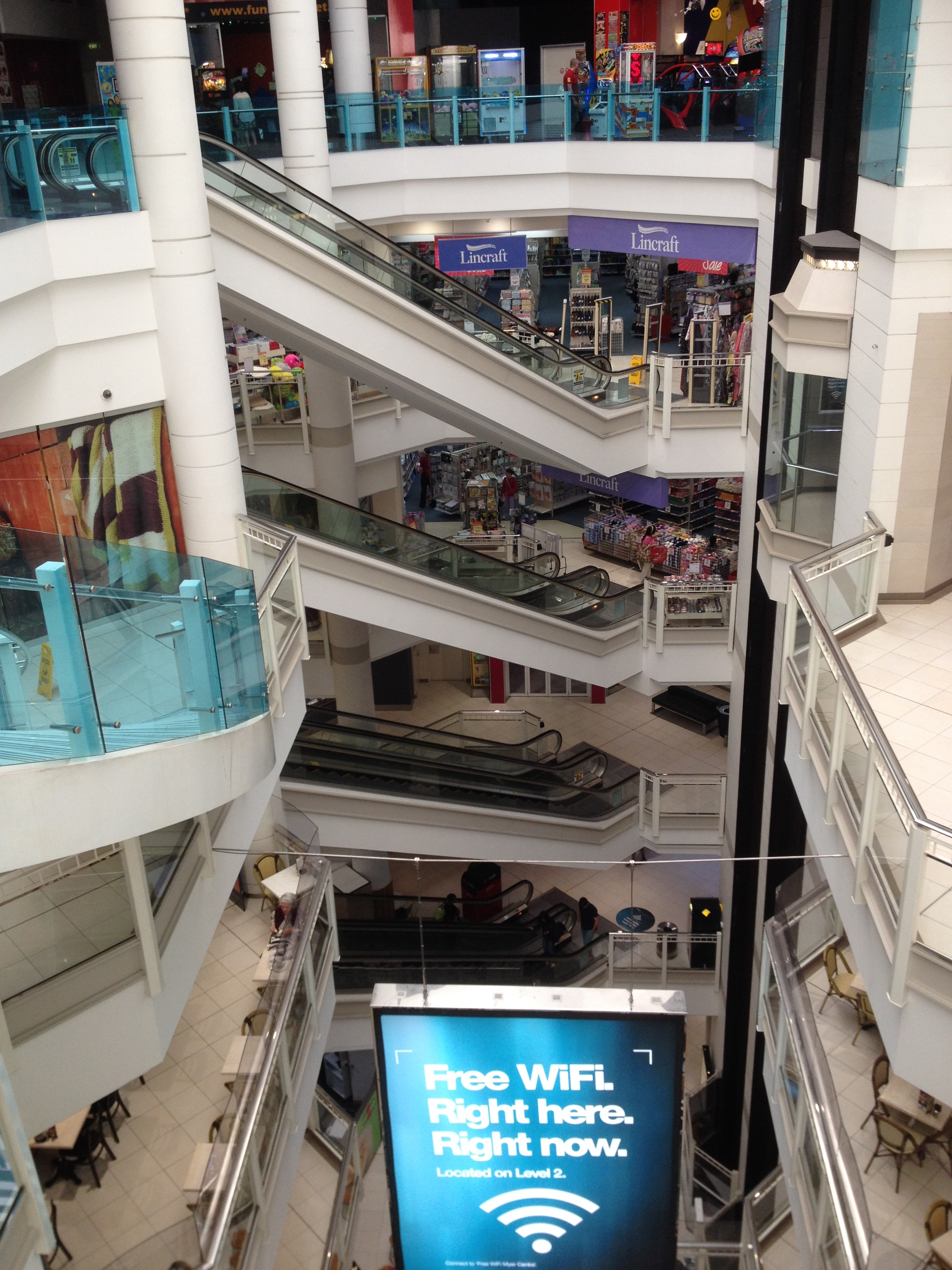
The Myer Centre atrium with Funhouse and Lincraft in the background

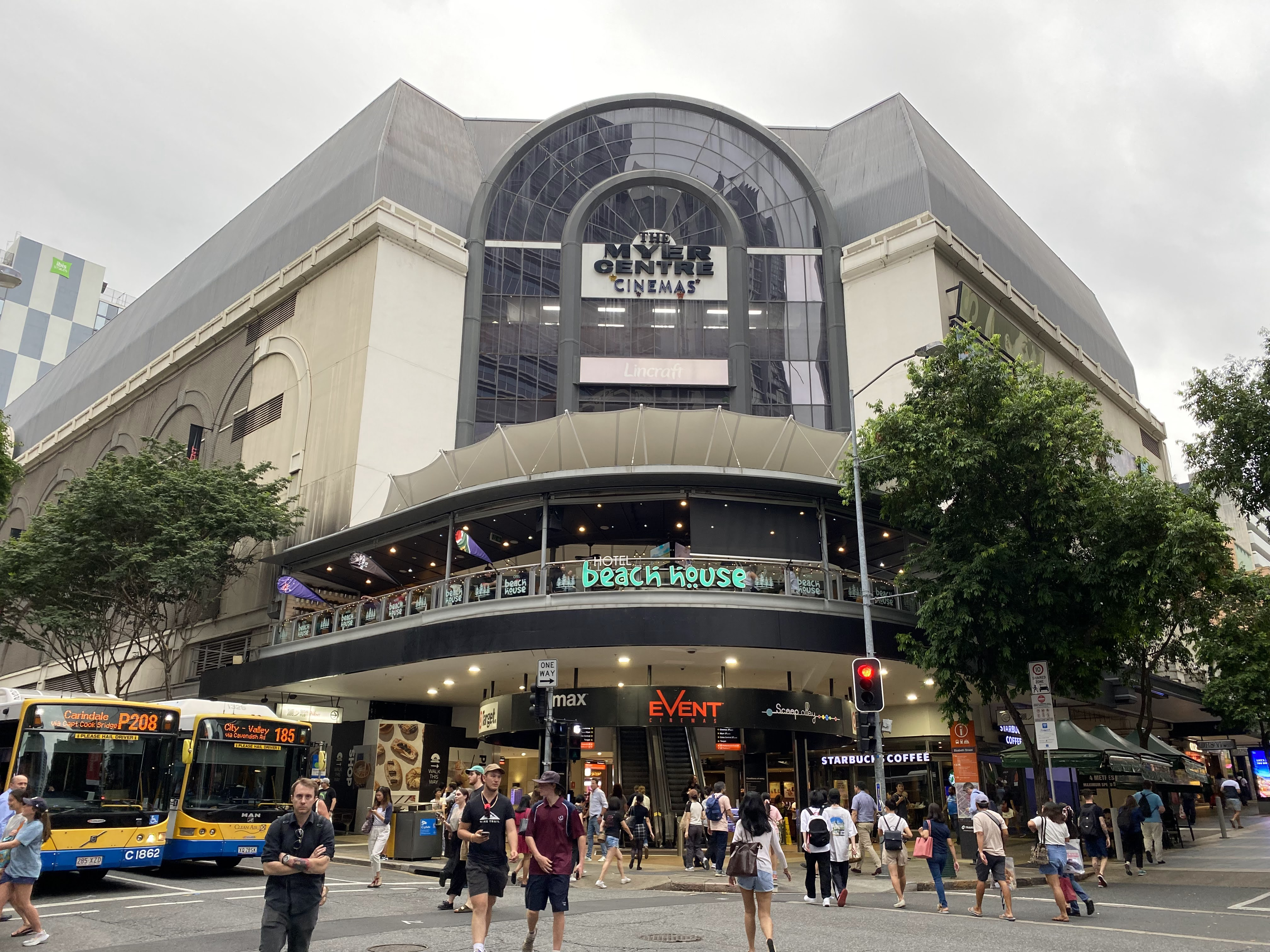
Entrance to The Myer Centre on the corner of Albert and Elizabeth Streets prior to rebranding

== See also ==
- List of shopping centres in Australia
