= QueensPlaza =

- Location: Queen Street Mall, Brisbane
- Coordinates: 27.468707°S 153.026322°E
- Address: 226 Queen Street
- Opened: 1 June 2005
- Developer: Colonial First State
- Owner: First Sentier Investors; Vicinity Centres
- Floor area: 36,000 square metres (390,000 sq ft)
- Floors: 5
- Parking: 600
- Website: queensplaza.com.au

QueensPlaza is an upmarket shopping centre located in the Brisbane central business district, Queensland, Australia, with frontages on Adelaide Street, Queen Street Mall, and Edward Street.

Built by Besix Watpac, construction began in September 2003. Stage 1 of QueensPlaza was completed in June 2005, with stage 2 being completed in October 2007. Stage 2 included giving the building more footage on the Adelaide Street side for more stores. The final stage, an expansion of David Jones, was opened in February 2008.

Car parking is available at five basement levels.

Fashion shows are held annually in the QueensPlaza as part of the Mercedes-Benz Fashion Festival Brisbane.

== Gallery ==
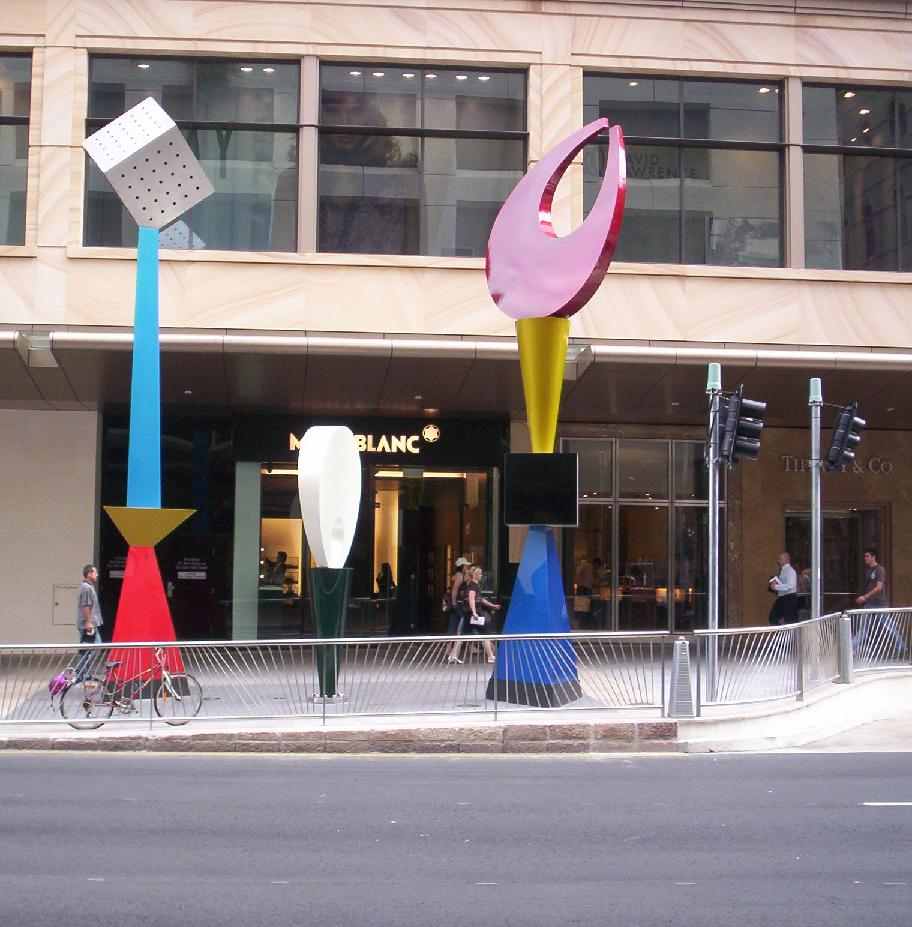
QueensPlaza sculptures on Edward Street

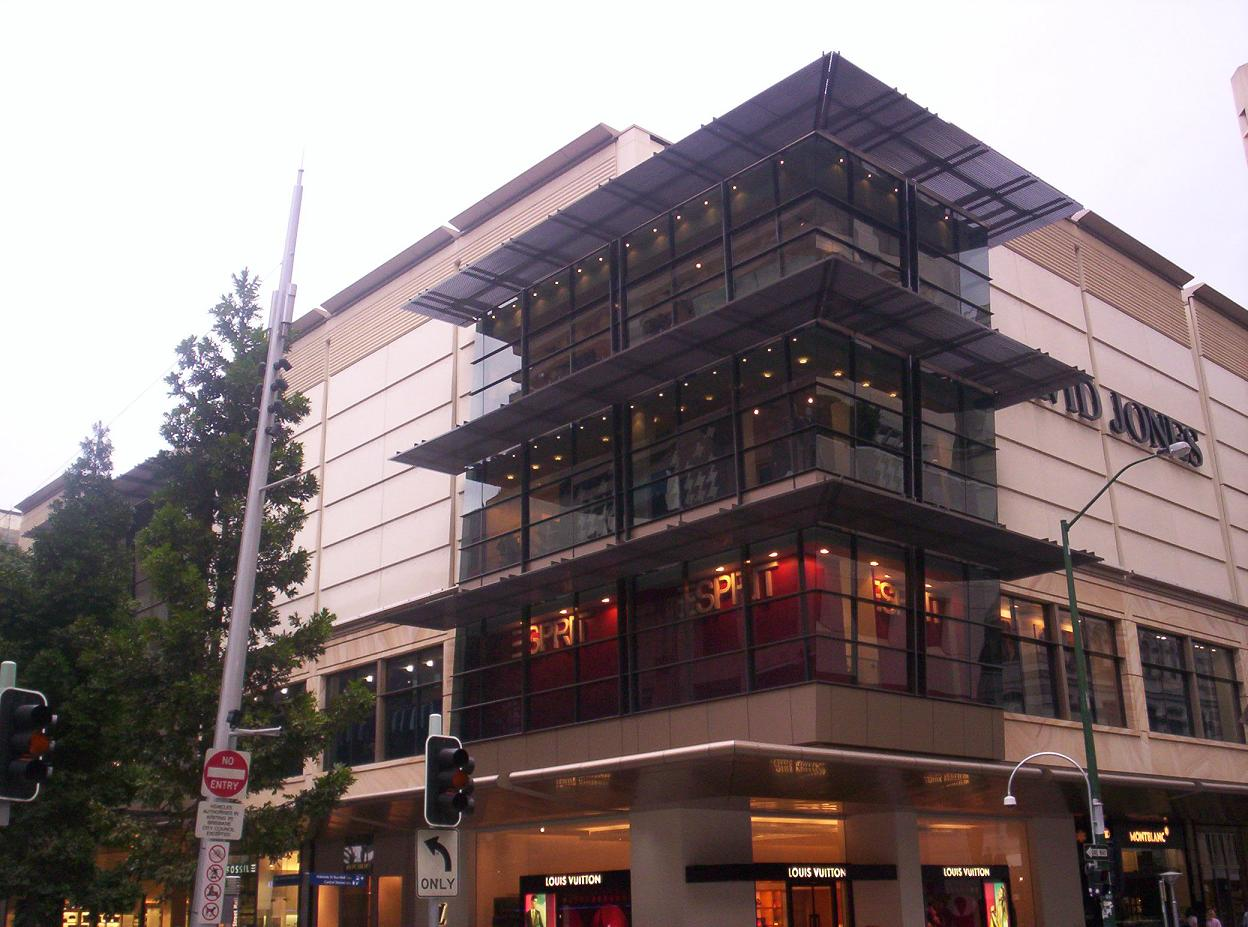
QueensPlaza entrance, corner Queen Street Mall and Edward Street

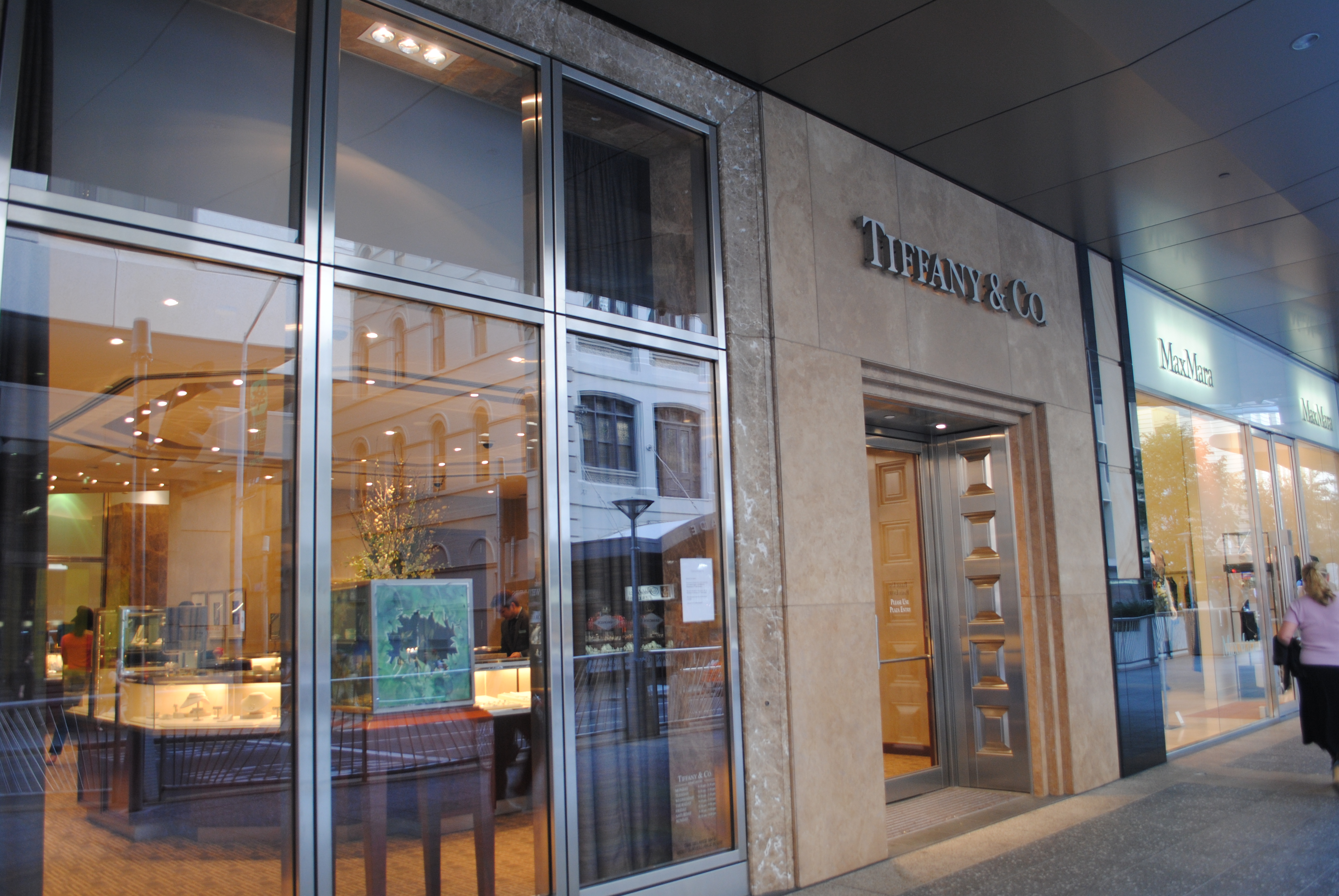
Tiffany & Co store

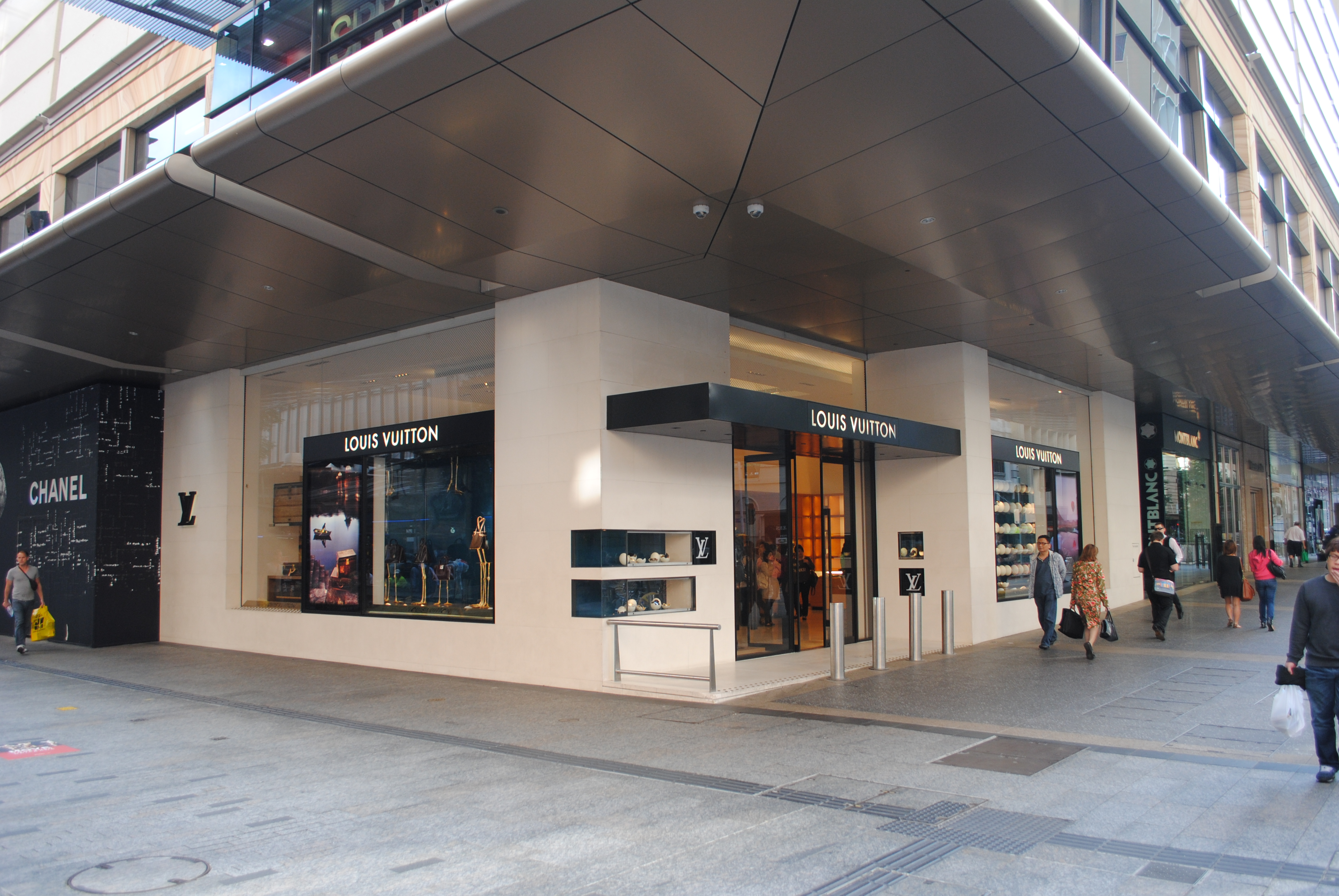
Louis Vuitton store

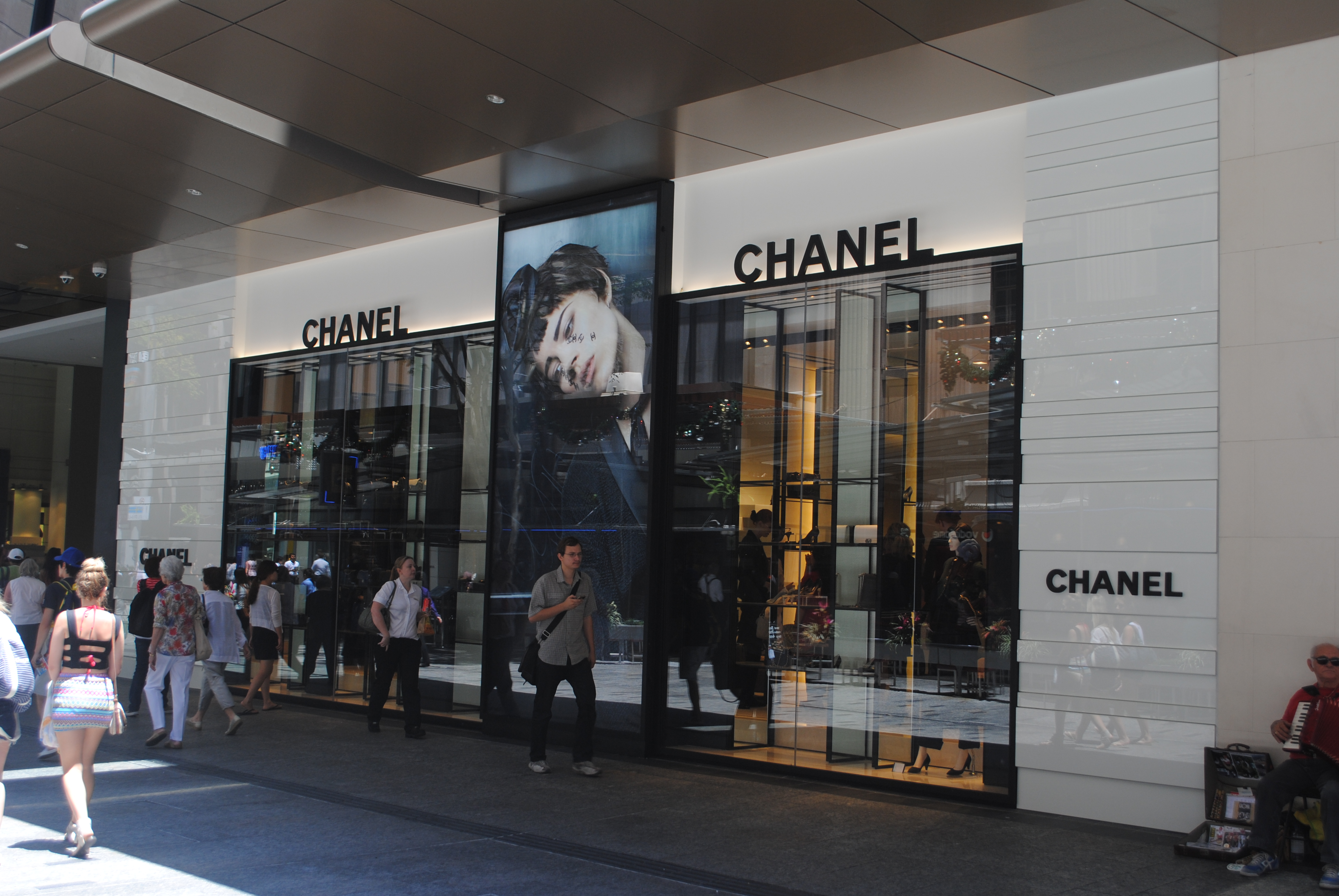
Chanel store
