= Dance Halls of Brisbane in the twentieth century =

Dance Halls of Brisbane in the twentieth century were popular venues for entertainment, socialising and reflected styles of music, architecture, popular culture and city planning.

== Early history ==
Private dances and balls in small halls around Brisbane eventually gave way to a larger audience experience, particularly after World War I and the advent of jazz music. Exhibition week was one of the most popular weeks in the city's dance calendar, as rural visitors came into Brisbane for the Brisbane Exhibition held in August each year and the event was commemorated with a public holiday. All styles of dance were available in Brisbane and the variety of arenas available made it possible for dancers to choose the venue they could best afford to attend. Most venues were located near train, tram or bus stations, mostly in the inner city. With the advent of talking motion pictures and the popularity of film musicals throughout the 1930s, people were keen to emulate their film idols such as Fred Astaire and Ginger Rogers. During World War II there was likely to be somewhere to dance at least three times a week, when almost 1 million United States military personnel were stationed on the east coast of Australia during the war in the Pacific.

Television broadcasts commenced in Australia in 1956 and began to make inroads on film attendance and to affect popular culture. After 1957, music changed with the advent of rock and roll and promoters brought in acts from overseas to appeal to modern tastes. Dance styles changed from the ballroom or modern styles featured in the 1920s and 1930s, jitterbug of the World War II era to rock and roll of the 1950s. Some of the international acts which toured Brisbane dance halls included Buddy Holly, Bill Haley and others. Clubs, discos and other venues thereafter became the standard musical venue for dances. Many of the venues previously used for dances were demolished.

== Blue Moon ==
This dance hall was in a wharf adjacent to the Victoria Street Bridge at South Brisbane and was designed by architect Ronald Martin Wilson. It offered weekly dances from 1935 until the 1950s. However it mainly functioned as a roller skating rink as it had a steel floor. This building was demolished to provide for abutments to the new bridge. A neon sign near the Trocadero Dansant recalls the history of the Blue Moon in the area.

== Brisbane City Hall ==
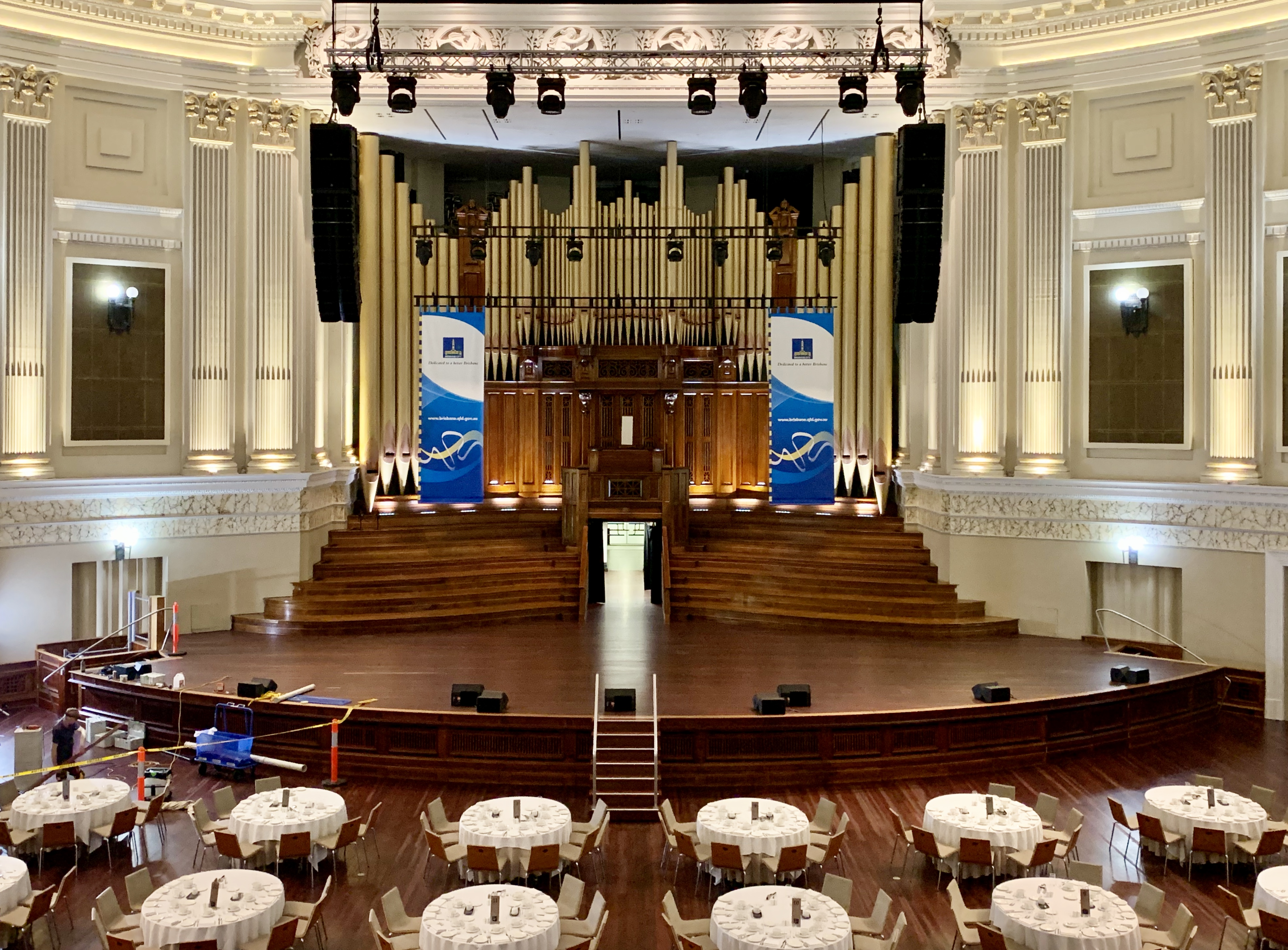
Brisbane City Hall Auditorium stage and organs

City Hall, designed by architects Hall & Prentice opened in 1930 in Adelaide Street, Brisbane. It is located next to King George Square. It was regularly used for balls and dances and continues to be leased for functions to this day.

== Caledonian Society Hall ==
The Caledonian Society and Burns Club occupied a number of buildings in Brisbane, including Centennial Hall before settling at 46 Elizabeth Street, Brisbane. The hall was leased out for use by many groups for weekly dances. The majority of this building, situated next door to the Myer Centre has been demolished to make way for a new hotel development, but the building's facade survives.

== Cantwell Ballroom ==
The Addie Cantwell Palais Ballroom opened in the 1930s at 436 Adelaide Street, Petrie Bight on the site of the dance hall previously known as the Ritz. It mainly functioned as a ballroom dancing studio, the largest in Australia at the time. In addition to classes in old time and modern ballroom, carnival nights and dances were scheduled weekly. The Cantwell Ballroom was a popular venue during World War II, with American G.I.s. The building has been demolished.

== Centennial Hall (Brisbane) ==
Centennial Hall opened in 1888 and was located in Adelaide Street, between Albert and Edward streets (where the present day Reserve Bank of Australia building is located). Its entrance faced the Brisbane Arcade. Its remodel with a design by Lange Powell in the 1920s emphasised Art Deco decoration and the building included marble stairs and a flat auditorium floor which could seat 700 people when not in use as a dance hall. It had a gallery area which could also seat 300 people if a floor show was playing that evening. Shops operated in the lower level of the building. It operated as a skating rink in the 1880s and music hall venue in the 1890s. It was operated as a bioscopy theatre from 1906 to 1919 and a vaudeville venue from 1940 to 1941. It became known as the Cocoanut Grove Ballroom after 1941, and was popular with US soldiers. Fire damaged the building in April 1942. Cocoanut Grove later became known as Birdland. Programs from productions at the Centennial are held in the Fryer Library of the University of Queensland.

== Cloudland Ballroom, also known as Luna Park ==
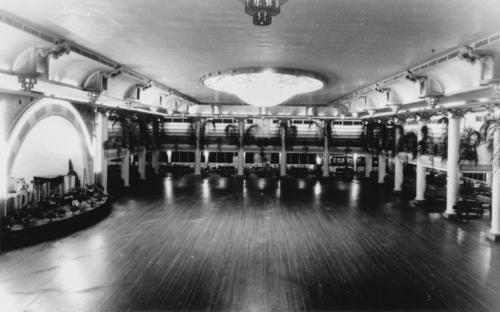
Cloudland

Cloudland opened in 1940, designed by T.H. Eslick, who had established Luna Park, Melbourne. It was situated in Bowen Hills at the top of a hill. A funicular railway ran from the main road at Breakfast Creek up the hill to provide easy access to the hall. This railway was dismantled in 1967 and replaced with a car park. The building itself had a distinctive parabolic laminated roof arch 18 metres high, which made it visible across Brisbane. It did not operate between 1940 and 1942 when Eslick abandoned the project. The U.S. military used the building during World War II. After the war the floors were replaced by the military and featured one inch tongue and groove boards that were not nailed. The dance floor in particular sat on heavy metal coil springs which provided a well sprung experience for dancers. Mya Winters and Francis Rouch purchased the building and it re-opened 1947. Famous guests to the hall included Sir Laurence Olivier and Vivien Leigh during their tour of Australia in 1948. It was a concert venue in the 1950s, and featured Australian and international performers such as Buddy Holly, Johnnie Ray, Paul Anka, Jerry Lee Lewis and others. In the 1960s a number of midnight to dawn dances were offered during long weekends or other holiday occasions.

The interior of the building featured decorative columns, domed skylights and chandeliers and generous curtains. It offered private alcoves for resting that sat above the dance floor area.

Cloudland was demolished in 1982 in controversial circumstances, to make way for an apartment complex.

== Doctor Carver Club ==
A services club for African American soldiers was established in 100 Grey Street, South Brisbane opposite the railway station, during World War II. Regular dances were held in the club. The building has since been demolished. The club's history was celebrated in the play, Boundary Street (2011).

== Finneys Auditorium ==
Finneys department store at 196 Queen Street (where the present day David Jones department store is located) featured a room on their fifth floor that could seat 700 and was offered for dances.

== Lennon's Hotel ==
Lennon's Hotel was originally situated in George Street but was rebuilt in 1941 to a design by Emil Sodersteen, and again in 1972 at its present site in Queen Street. Lennon's offered a small dance floor from the 1920s and due to its status as the town's leading hotel, attracted celebrities visiting Brisbane for performances and other events. The hotel was largely taken over by the US military during World War II.

== Ozanam House ==
Ozanam House, the St Vincent de Paul Hall in Gotha Street, Fortitude Valley opened in 1937, built to a design by J. P. Donoghue and offered another venue for dancing.

== Queensland Jive Club ==
Jack Busteed ran a dance studio from 1948 in a building in Post Office Square in Adelaide Street and demonstrated jive. It had a membership of over 1000 people. 100 dancers would come to the dance nights.

== Railway Institute ==
The Railway Institute in Edward Street above Central station was another popular venue for dancing.

== South Brisbane Tech ==
The South Brisbane Tech or South Brisbane Municipal Library and Technical Institute was built in 1881 to serve as the South Brisbane Post Office. It was located between Stanley and Dock Streets. A concert hall toward the rear of the building offered balls and dances weekly, operating from 1906 to 1973. It now houses the Griffith University Film School. It is a heritage listed building.

== Trocadero Dansant ==
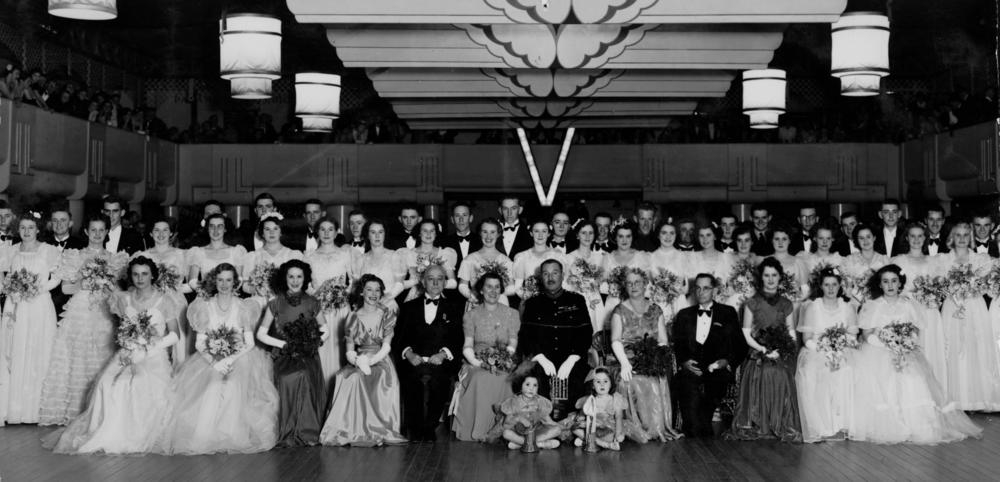
Masonic Ball at the Trocadero in Brisbane, 1941 (9312686282)

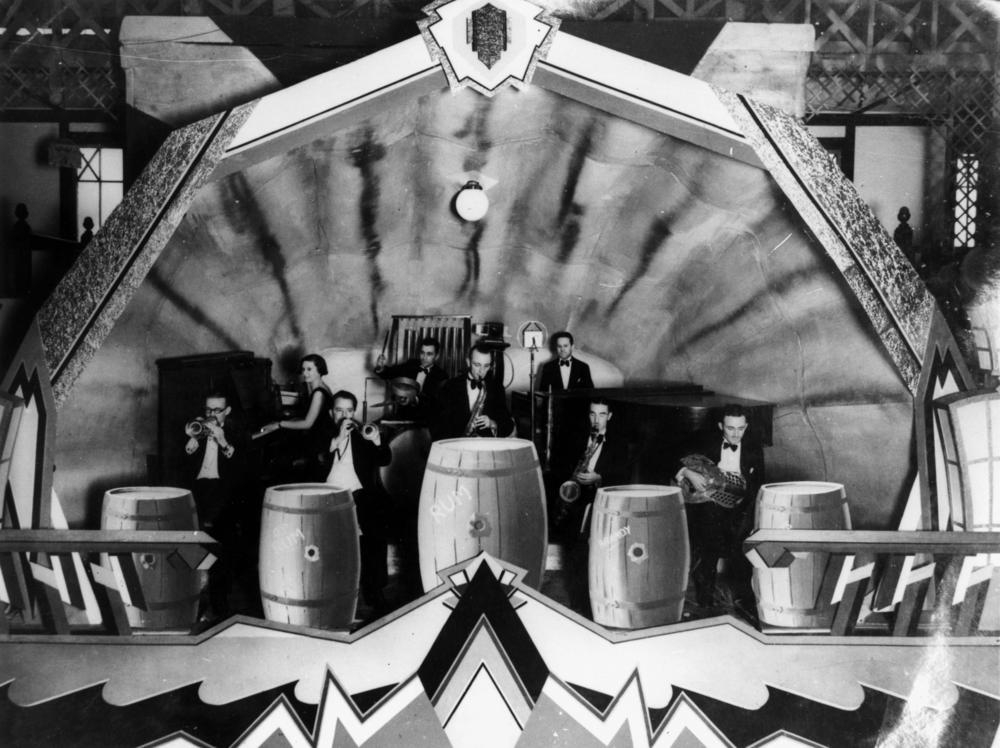
Billo Smith's Dance Band at the Trocadero Dance Hall, Brisbane, ca. 1931 (9234368037)

The Trocadero Dansant opened 1923 as a high class dance hall in South Brisbane, taking advantage of the popularity for jazz style music particular to the 1920s. It was situated in Melbourne Street facing the railway terminus. It had been designed by architects Hall & Prentice. It featured a painted ceiling, greenery and purple and blue electric lighting. A central chandelier, much like an early disco ball, directed light to the corners of the room. The dance hall provided 52 alcoves for patrons to rest and socialise, featuring mission oak furniture. 300 palm trees were used in window boxes and in hallways to provide a tropical effect. 1200 dancers could be accommodated on the floor which was polished to a high standard. It featured an orchestra and offered regular competitions tied to movies as well as beauty pageants. Billo Smith was one of the most popular band leaders of the time.

The grand opening of the Trocadero Dansent was on the 13 May 1923 and an estimated 2,000 people attended.

The Trocadero closed after World War II, as patrons sought out the new Cloudland dance hall. It was demolished in the 1950s to make way for the construction of the rail line connecting South Brisbane station to Roma Street station. A sign located in Melbourne Street, South Brisbane records the location of the Hall.

Selected programs from events at the Trocadero are held in the Fryer Library at the University of Queensland.
