= Rooftop Theatre =

Notable venues with rooftop theatres include:

- Madison Square Garden (1890)
- 44th Street Theatre
- New Amsterdam Theatre
- National Theater (Manhattan)
- Tivoli Theatre, Brisbane

== Other ==
- Dramatic Workshop staged productions at the “Rooftop Theatre” at 111 East Houston Street, in New York City
