= Eslick =

Eslick is a surname. Notable people with the surname include:

- Carolyn Eslick (born 1950), American politician
- Danny Eslick (born 1986), American motorcycle racer
- Edward Everett Eslick (1872–1932), American politician
- Tollemache Heriot Eslick (1877–1948), English amusement engineer
- Willa McCord Blake Eslick (1878–1961), American politician, wife of Edward
