= Lotus Isle =

Defunct amusement park in Portland, Oregon, U.S.

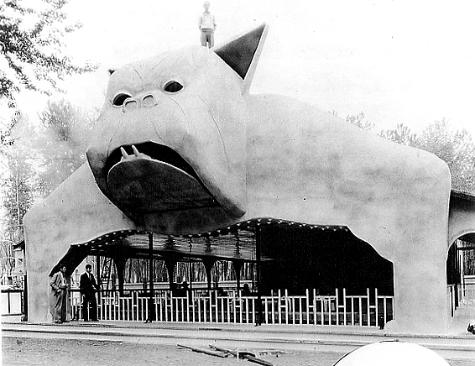
- "Bulldog" bumper cars at Lotus Isle
- Location: Tomahawk Island, Portland, Oregon, U.S.
- Coordinates: 45.610945°N 122.673984°W
- Status: Defunct
- Opened: June 28, 1930
- Closed: 1932
- Owner: Edwin F. Platt

Lotus Isle Amusement Park was an amusement park that operated from 1930 to 1932 on Tomahawk Island in Portland, Oregon. Known as the "Wonderland of the Pacific Northwest", Lotus Isle was located just east of the more successful Jantzen Beach Amusement Park. Lotus Isle spread out over 128 acres (0.52 km^{2}) and at the time was Portland's largest amusement park.

== History ==
=== 1930: Construction and opening ===
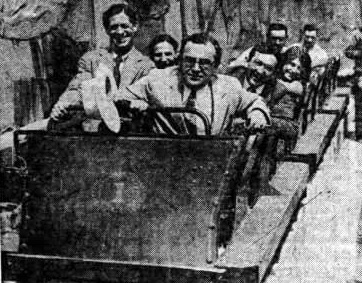
T. H. Eslick, builder of Lotus Isle, riding the monorail (center), 1930

Lotus Isle Amusement Park opened on June 28, 1930, after a group of investors realized the success of the nearby Jantzen Beach Amusement Park. At the time of its opening, Lotus Isle was the largest amusement park in Oregon. The park consisted of forty attractions including bumper cars, a rollercoaster, a log cabin-style cafe, and a dance hall called the Peacock Ballroom. The Peacock Ballroom cost approximately $60,000 to construct.

==== Injury and death incidents ====
A patron of the park allegedly sustained injuries while riding a rollercoaster in the park on July 13, 1930, and sought $25,000 in damages over the incident.

On August 28, 1930, eleven-year-old Ronald Ralston drowned at the Lotus Isle beach after slipping from a ladder beneath the park's main diving board. The following day, the park's owner, Edwin F. Platt, committed suicide in the park office by shooting himself in the heart. Platt "spent a fortune" in constructing Lotus Isle, which cost between $500,000 and $600,000. According to The Oregonian, finances were given consideration in the inquiry following Platt's death. Business at the park had not been as brisk as its investors had hoped for, and it experienced "internal discord" such as the discharge of its manager, T. H. Eslick, who later sued the park for violating the agreement whereby he was brought on as manager. Ralston's family pursued a lawsuit against the park seeking $25,000 in damages over his death.

=== 1930–1931: Subsequent season ===
On March 22, 1931, prior to the park's second season, an airplane crashed into the park's scenic railway in front of the Peacock Ballroom. The pilot and his two passengers sustained minor injuries, but survived the crash.

The park re-opened on May 16, 1931 under the management of promoted Al Painter, with approximately $100,000 spent in improvements and new attractions. Painter created a "Dance-A-Thon" event in the park's Peacock Ballroom, which held room for 6,600 dancers. An 85-foot (26 m) ferris wheel was introduced as a new attraction, as well as the "Y-Alps", a scenic alpine-themed ride.

During this time, John Ringling sold Lotus Isle a temperamental bull elephant named "Tusko" who soon destroyed several pavilions after being spooked by a low-flying stunt plane. The elephant, which had previously rampaged through Sedro-Woolley, Washington, eventually ended up in Seattle's Woodland Park Zoo.

On August 24, 1931, almost a year after the drowning and Platt's suicide, the Peacock Ballroom burned to the ground after a transformer explosion ignited a fire on the building's cupola and roof. The destruction of the Peacock Ballroom cost the park approximately $90,000 in losses.

=== 1932: Disestablishment ===
The park operated once more in the 1932 season before going into bankruptcy, after which liquidation of the park property began.

== Attractions ==
- "Whiz" - wood roller coaster
- Alpine Scenic Railway
- Bulldog Bumper Cars
- 100-foot (30 m) neon Eiffel Tower sign at the entrance
- 1914 Herschell-Spillman menagerie merry-go-round -- currently located in San Francisco's Golden Gate Park

== See also ==
- Jantzen Beach Amusement Park
- Oaks Amusement Park
