= Finney Isles & Co Building =

Heritage listed building in Brisbane, Queensland

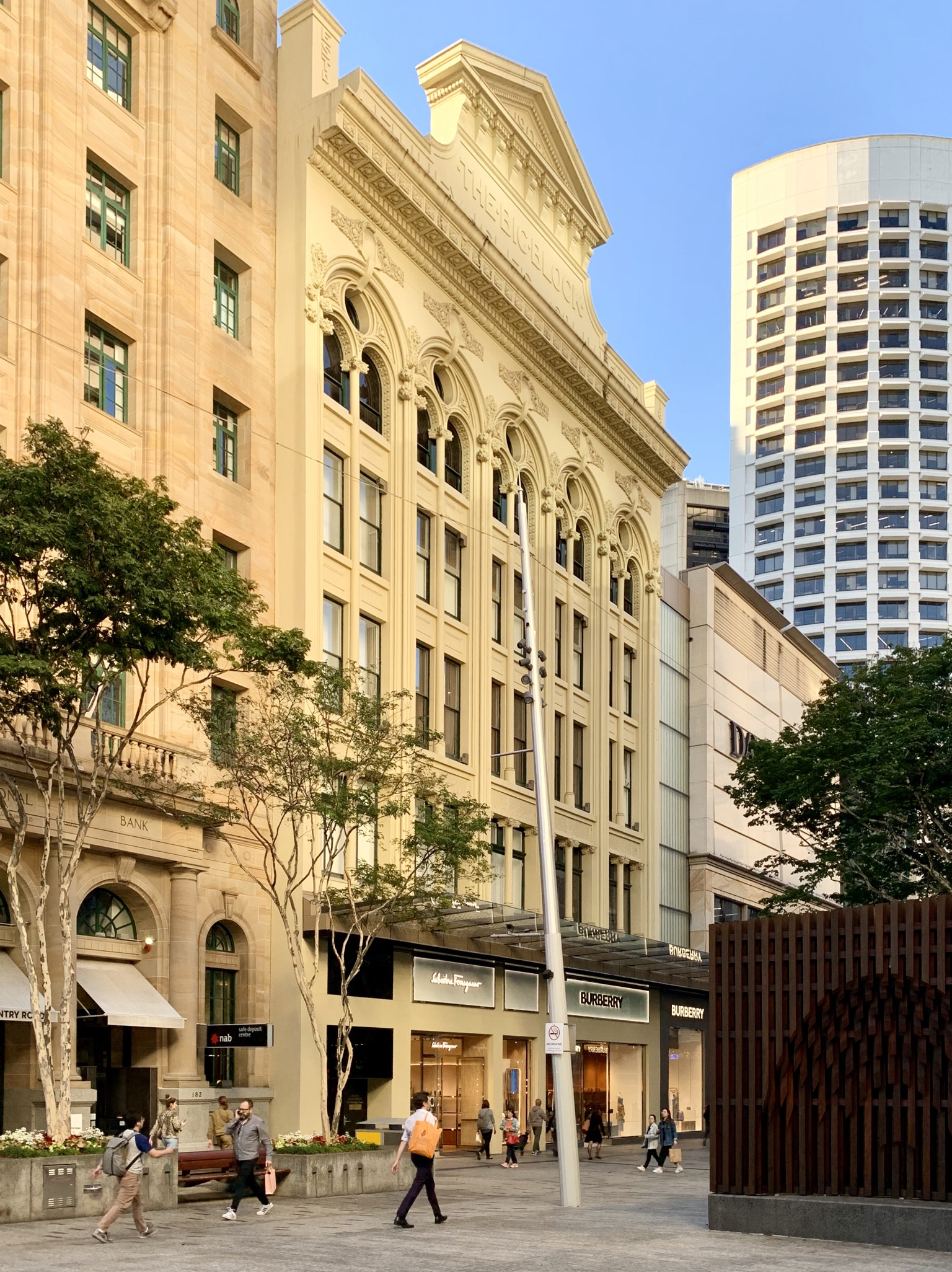
- Former Finney Isles & Co Building, 2020

- Location within Queensland
- 27.4685°S 153.0259°E
- Location: 196 Queen Street, Brisbane, Queensland, Australia

History
- Design period: 1900–1914 (early 20th century)
- Built: 1909–1910

Site notes
- Architect: Claude William Chambers

Queensland Heritage Register
- Official name: David Jones, Finney Isles & Co
- Type: state heritage (built)
- Designated: 21 October 1992
- Reference no.: 600142
- Significant period: 1909–1970 (fabric); 1909–1965 (historical)
- Significant components: tower – water
- Builders: James Mason

Finney Isles & Co Building is a heritage-listed department store at 196 Queen Street, Brisbane, Queensland, Australia. It was designed by Claude William Chambers and built from 1909 to 1910 by James Mason. It was also known as David Jones.

In 1992 the building was listed on the Queensland Heritage Register; at that time, the building was occupied by David Jones which had taken over Finney Isles & Co in the 1960s.

== History ==
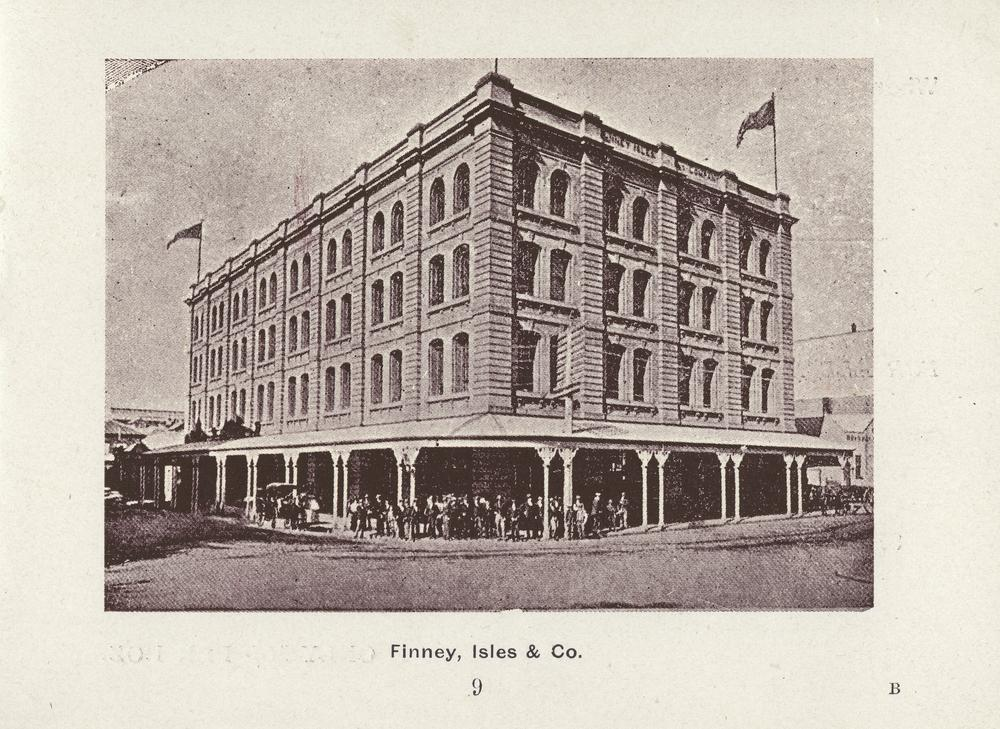
Finney Isles & Co Building, corner of Edward and Adelaide Streets, 1902 (not the present building)

This department store complex was built in stages between 1909 and 1936 for the firm of Finney Isles & Co. The firm was established by Thomas Finney and James Isles in 1864 with a draper's store in Fortitude Valley. The business quickly expanded, occupying Queen Street premises in the 1870s, then the City Exchange building in Edward and Adelaide Streets from the mid 1880s in which it sold a wide range of clothing, furniture and household items. Finney Isles, like many retailing firms, had a manufacturing section making both clothing and furniture.

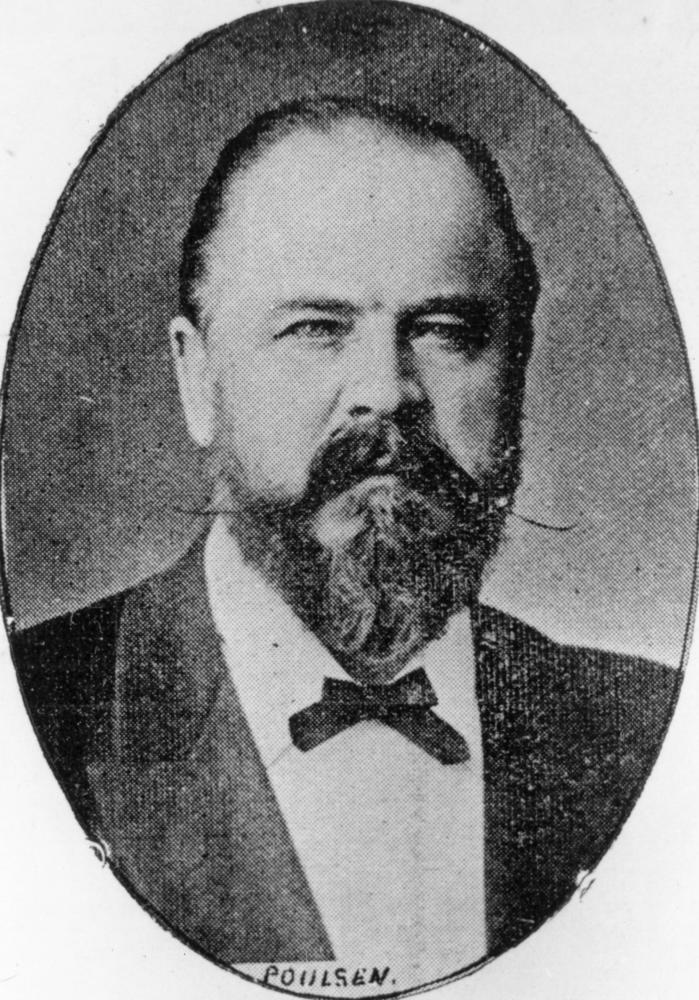
Thomas Finney, circa 1896

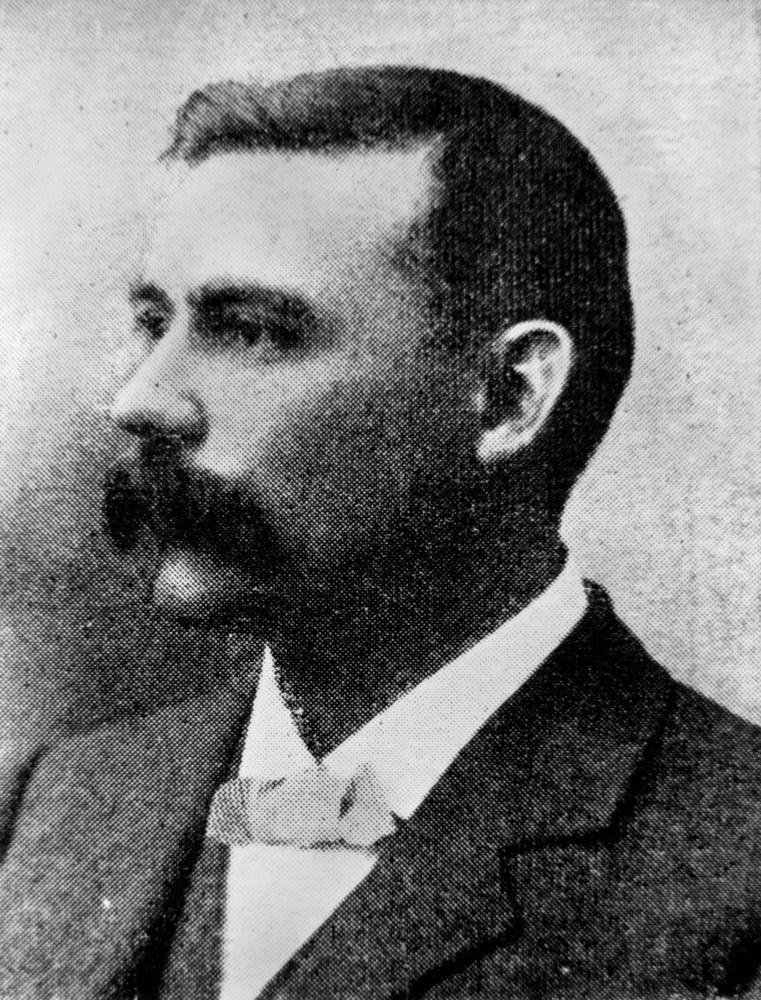
Francis Alexander Jackson Isles, 1902

New premises, which were called the "Big Block", were erected for the company in 1909–1910. Designed by C W Chambers with J Mason the contractor, the building comprised five floors on Queen Street and three floors on Adelaide Street. The use of reinforced concrete for structural purposes was one of the first occasions in Queensland. The Adelaide Street site was previously occupied by the Gaiety Theatre and part of its southern wall was incorporated in the new structure. The building featured innovative display windows on Queen Street, silky oak staircases, lifts decorated in latticed ironwork and silky oak, pneumatic tubes for exchanging cash, a rooftop water tower and a large generator providing electricity to the lights, lifts, pneumatic system and the 400 sewing machines in the workrooms.

In 1921 the company acquired a two storeyed building adjoining the northern side of the Queen Street store and it was converted for use as the men's department. In 1929 this building was extended to four storeys and the facade remodelled to a similar style of the 1909 store.

The complex was further extended in 1936 when a three storeyed building was erected on the southern side of the Adelaide Street store. Designed by the Bruce Partridge of Sydney architects Mackellar and Partridge and Atkinson and Conrad, the work was undertaken by Stuart Bros Ltd. The facade was rendered in cream coloured cement. It featured pilasters designed in a modern vertical style with Art Deco spandrel panels of terracotta.

Additional floors and a screen were added to the 1929 Queen Street building after 1949 and the 1936 Adelaide Street building was extended to five storeys prior to 1962. An auditorium was constructed on the fifth floor which worked as a gallery space and venue for dances through the 1930s and war years. A self service cafeteria opened in 1951 within the store. Finney Isles & Co was taken over by David Jones in the 1960s.

== Description ==
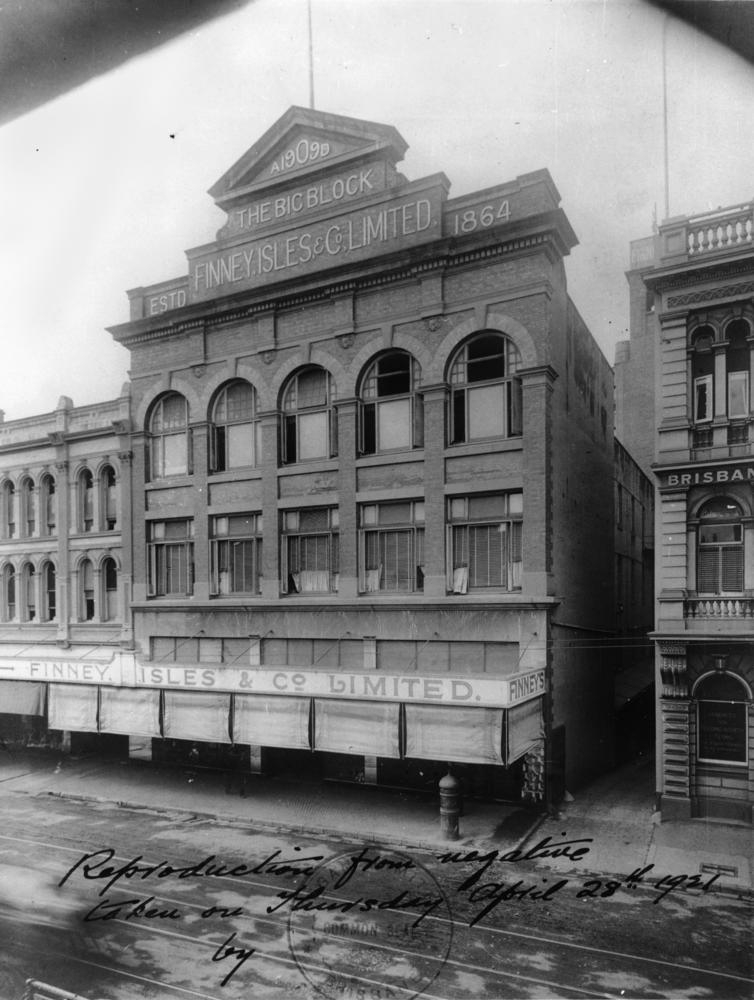
The Big Block, 1921

The building with frontages to Queen and Adelaide Streets, comprises four main sections of varying levels and differing facade treatment.

The southern Queen Street section (1909) has six storeys with a basement. The facade contains five vertical bays of windows, now painted, above the ground floor level. The bays are divided by a cluster of slender columns and mouldings extending into delicate floral decoration at their top. The cornice is elaborately decorated with egg and dart moulding, and rows of rosettes on the soffit and face. The words, "THE BIG BLOCK" and "FINNEY ISLES & CO. LIMITED" are contained on the parapet in raised lettering. Above the parapet is a central raised classical pediment containing the date "A1909D". A concrete and glass overhead walkway that spans from the building to the opposite side of the Queen Street Mall intrudes into the facade at the first floor level.

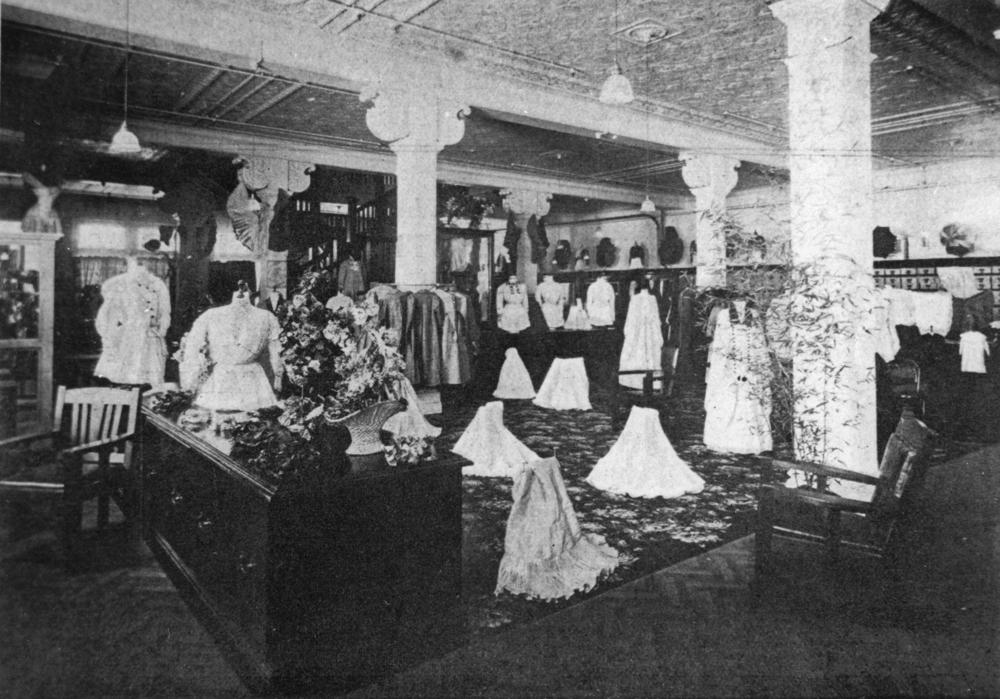
Interior of Finney Isles & Co, 1910

The northern Queen Street section (1929 with extensions in 1949) is of six levels. The facade comprises a perforated steel screen masking an earlier facade.

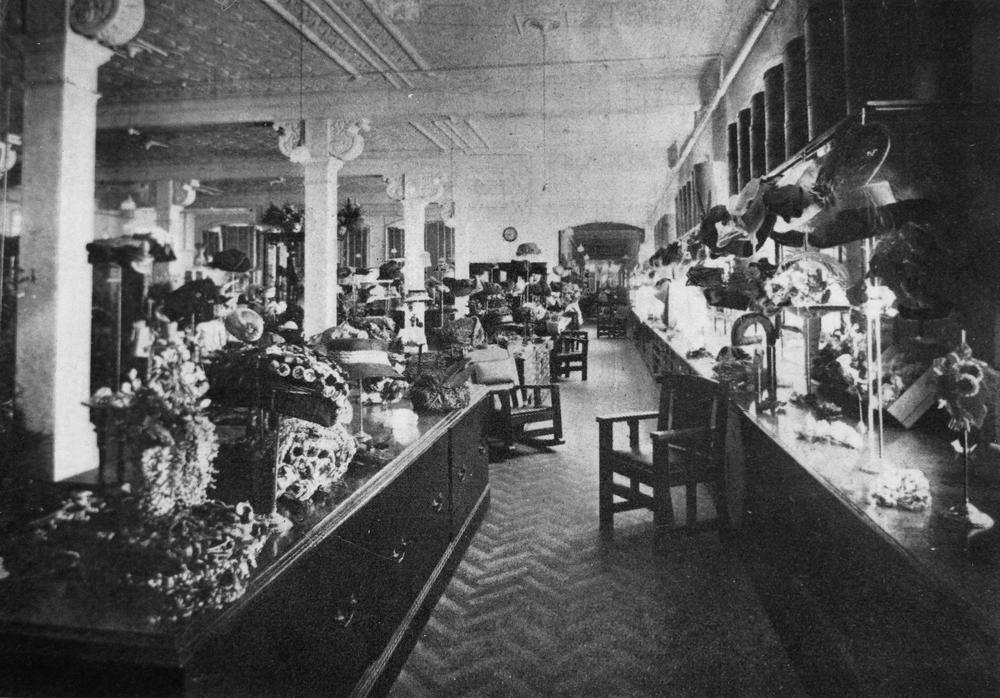
Interior, 1910

The northern Adelaide Street section (1909) comprises three storeys. The facade is more austere than that of Queen Street, reflecting the lesser importance of this street address. Originally having five distinct bays, half of the far right bay has been removed in the construction of the neighbouring section. The upper level windows have broad arched openings that are visually connected to the square headed windows below by plain flanking pilasters. The windows have been painted. Above these at parapet level is a central triangular pediment incorporating the date "A 1909 D".

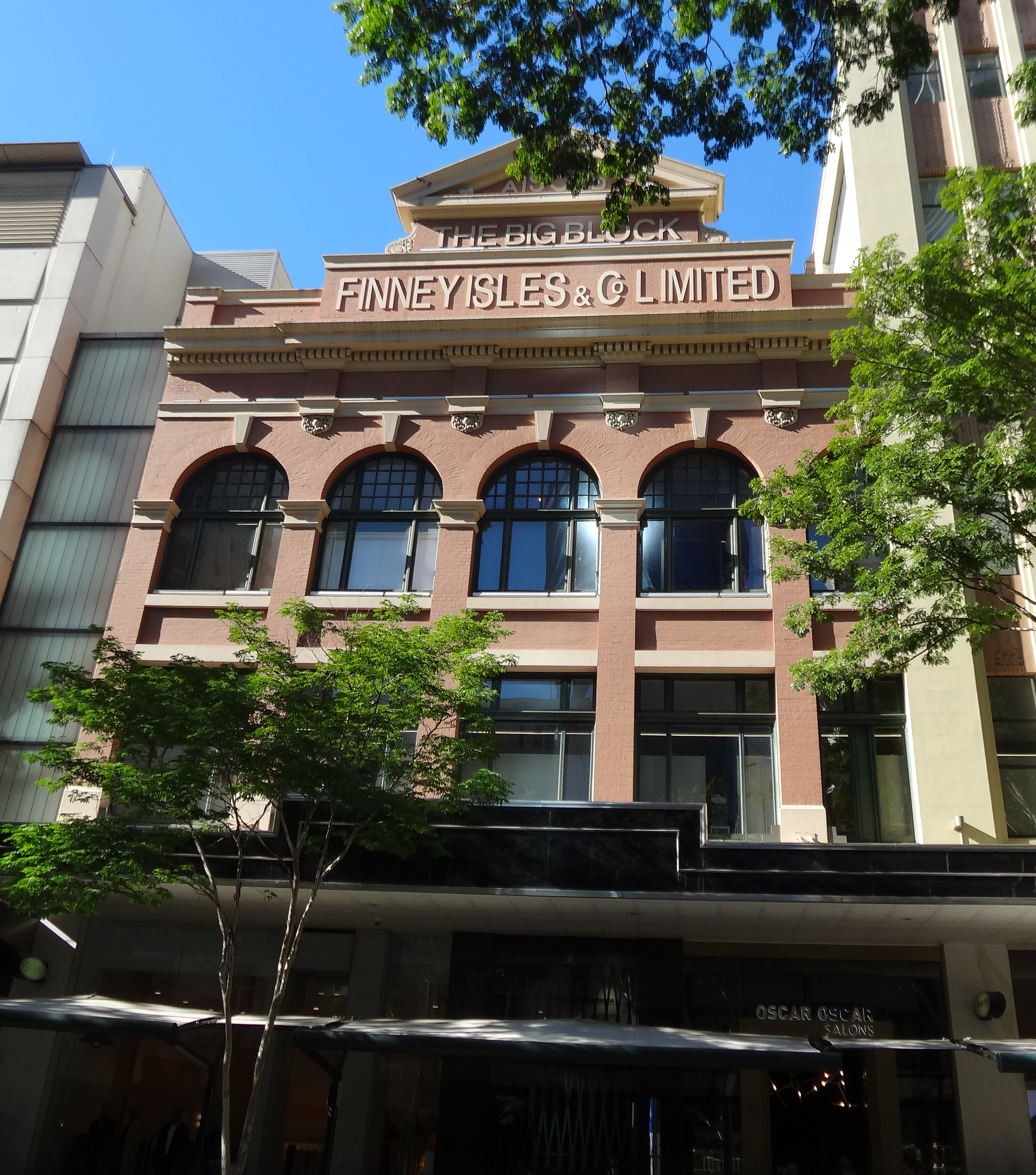
Adelaide Street facade

The southern Adelaide Street section (1936) comprises six storeys. The facade, in the Art Deco style, consists of three bays of four windows separated by pilasters. The art deco treatment returns for some distance along the southern wall. The windows, now painted, are all small, slender rectangular openings. Decorative friezes occur between the pilasters at each change in level, and again on the parapet.

The shopfronts at both Adelaide Street and Queen Streets contain modern glazing, finishes and fittings.

Internally the store has been substantially changed. Part of the original ceiling is visible at the front of the 1909 Queen Street section on the upper level. On the first floor of the Adelaide Street section the ceiling is also substantially intact. The 1930s Adelaide Street section retains much of its Art Deco detailing, particularly evident is the black and white Rockhampton marble around the lift wells.

== Heritage listing ==
The building was listed on the Queensland Heritage Register on 21 October 1992 having satisfied the following criteria.

The place is important in demonstrating the principal characteristics of a particular class of cultural places.

The building demonstrates the principal characteristics of a larger scale and early 20th century department store and forms part of streetscape consisting of a group of complementary buildings including the nearby National Australia Bank and Prouds buildings.

The place is important because of its aesthetic significance.

The building exhibits important aesthetic characteristics valued by the community, in particular the finely articulated 1909 Queen Street facade, the disciplined 1936 art deco facade and the building's contribution to the Queen and Adelaide streetscapes.

The place has a special association with the life or work of a particular person, group or organisation of importance in Queensland's history.

The building has a special association with the life and work of Thomas Finney and James Isles, and with their firm, Finney Isles & Co, a major Queensland department store.
