= National Australia Bank (180 Queen Street) =

Heritage-listed building in Brisbane, Queensland

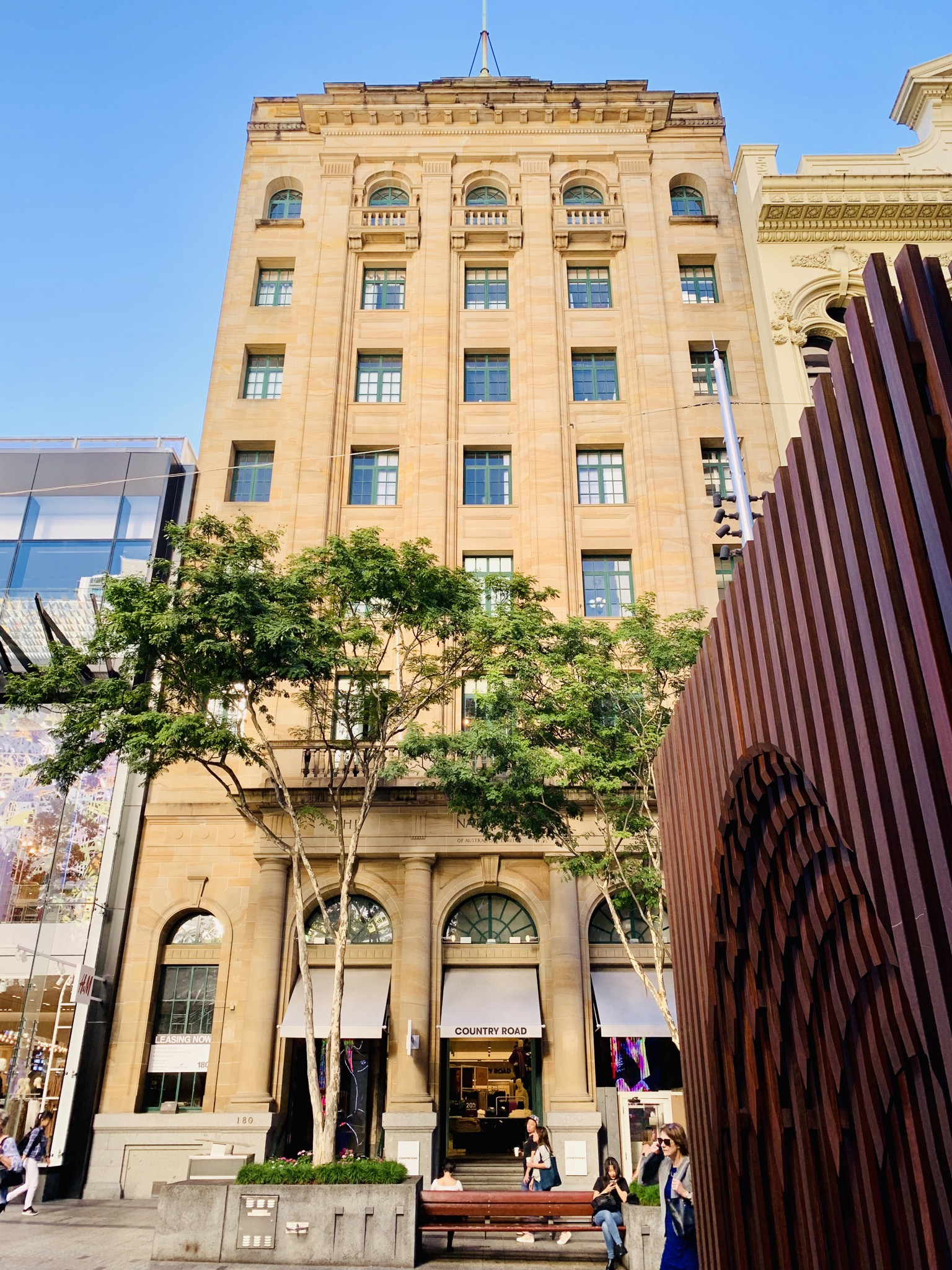
- National Australia Bank, 180 Queen Street, 2019

- Location within Queensland Location within Australia
- 27.4687°S 153.0259°E
- Location: 180 Queen Street, Brisbane City, City of Brisbane, Queensland, Australia

History
- Design period: 1919–1930s (interwar period)
- Built: 1929–1930

Site notes
- Architect: A & K Henderson
- Architectural style: Classical Revival

Queensland Heritage Register
- Official name: National Australia Bank, National Bank of Australasia
- Type: state heritage (built)
- Designated: 21 October 1992
- Reference no.: 600141
- Significant period: 1929–1930 (fabric)
- Significant components: furniture/fittings, strong room, banking chamber
- Builders: George Alexander Stronach

National Australia Bank is a heritage-listed former bank building at 180 Queen Street, Brisbane City, City of Brisbane, Queensland, Australia. It was designed by A & K Henderson and built from 1929 to 1930 by George Alexander Stronach. It is also known as National Bank of Australasia. It was added to the Queensland Heritage Register on 21 October 1992.

== History ==
This building, constructed in 1929–1930, replaced an earlier bank which had erected in 1891 for the Royal Bank of Queensland. In 1917 the Royal Bank of Queensland merged with another Queensland bank, the Bank of North Queensland to form the Bank of Queensland. In 1922, the Bank of Queensland was absorbed by the National Bank of Australasia and several years later decided to build a new bank on the site.

Designed by Melbourne architects A & K Henderson with assistance from local firm of Atkinson, Powell & Conrad, the contractor was G A Stronach, with the technical advice of Thomas Walker Pearce. It was an example of the pervasive fashion for the neo-classical style in commercial and civic buildings, of similar scale and materials during the period. The building was opened on 6 May 1930 and its lavish fittings and imposing style attracted favourable comment. Prominent features of the building included the large bronze doors in the Queen Street entrance, separate lifts for tenants, and a special women's banking section fitted with lounge, retiring room, writing facilities and telephone. Over the years various professional tenants have occupied the upper floors - solicitors, doctors, accountants, architects, and optometrists.

The new building, like its predecessor, served as the head office of the National Bank of Australasia in Queensland until 1948 when it absorbed the last of the distinctively Queensland banks of the nineteenth century, the Queensland National Bank. The new head office was set up in the former Queensland National Bank building on the corner of Queen and Creek Streets. In 1983 the National Bank of Australasia merged with the Commercial Banking Corporation to form the National Australia Bank.

The bank no longer owns the building. It was sold in 2012 for $29.5 million. However, the bank continue to operate a safety deposit facility in the building's basement. Country Road operated a retail store from the ground floor while small tenants occupied the upper floors. Subsequently, Louis Vuitton renovated the building and has occupied the space, since 25 March 2023.

== Description ==
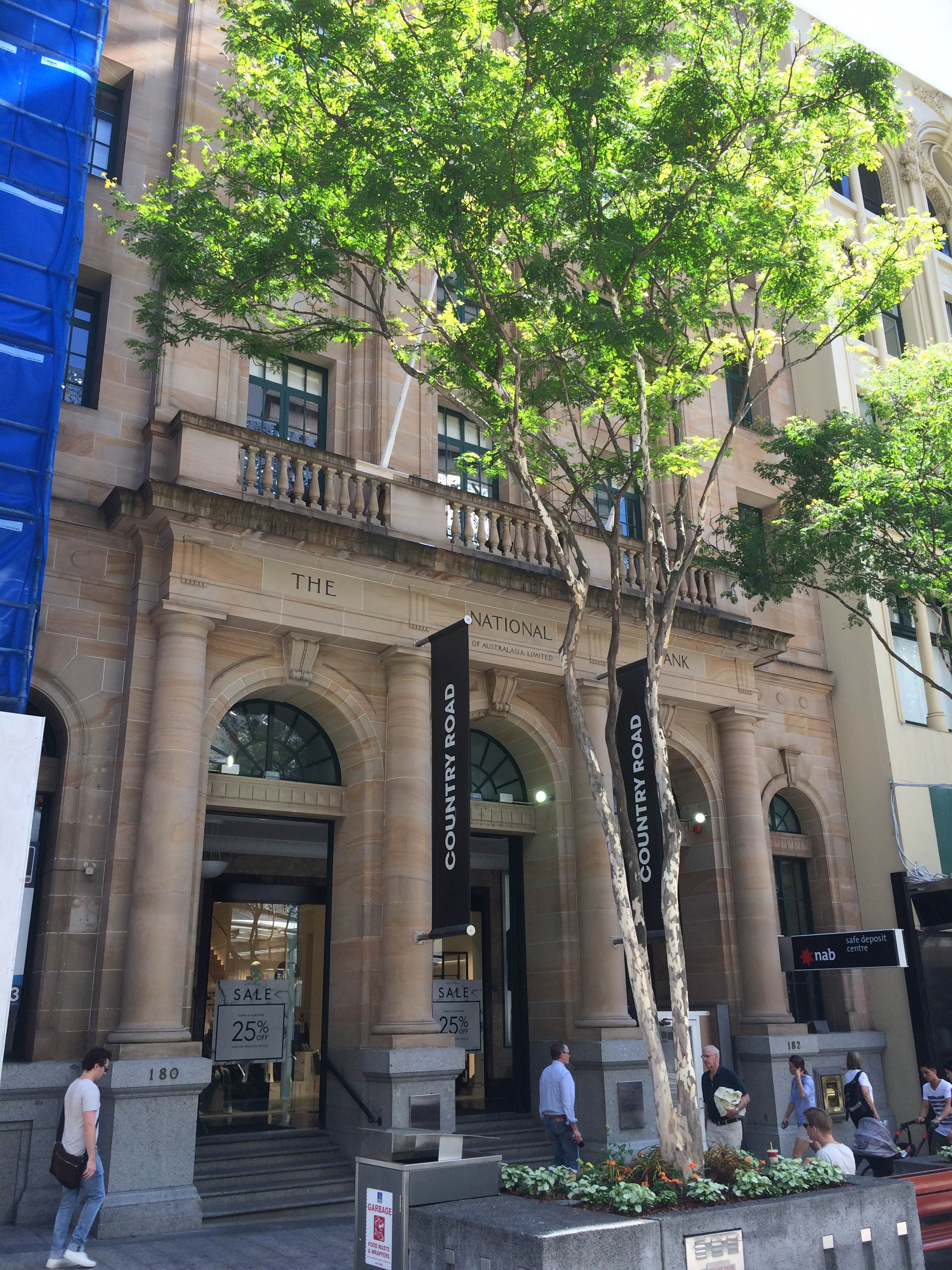
Lower facade, 2015

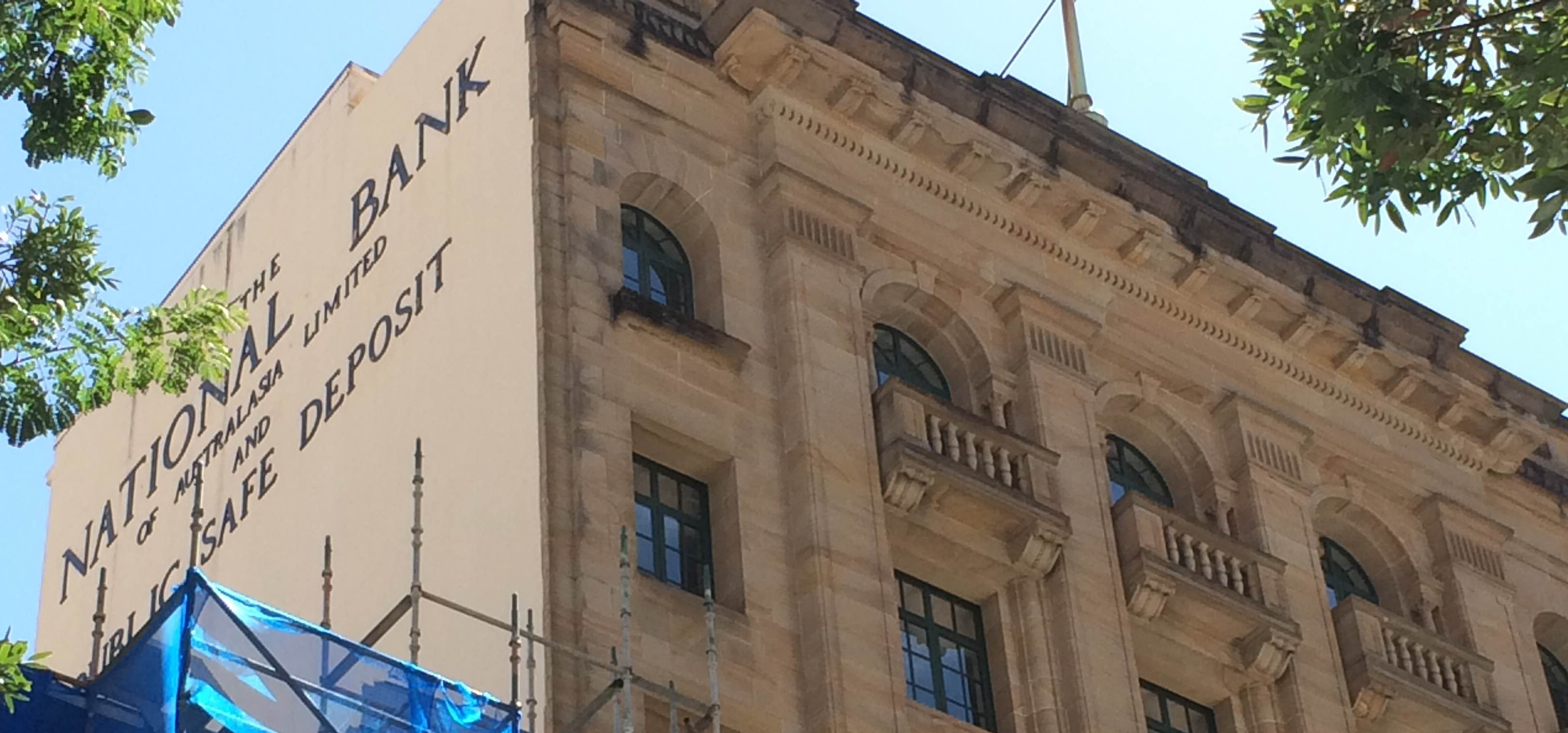
Bank signage, 2015

The National Australia Bank Central Branch, located at 180 Queen Street, is a seven storey structure with a steel frame and reinforced concrete floors and roof. The external walls are brick with sandstone facing and a granite plinth on the front facade. The sandstone is from Yangan, Queensland and the granite from Uralla, New South Wales.

The main facade, in the Classical Revival style, is divided into five vertical bays. The three central bays are distinguished by flanking giant order pilasters which extend from above the ground floor level to the cornice line below the parapet.

The openings on the upper level have semicircular arches. The three central openings have individual balconies with balustrading and a projecting cornice/balustrade that returns to the flanking side bays. These are plainer with narrower openings. The original glazing on the building has been replaced by aluminium framed glazing to a similar pattern.

At the ground floor level the building has four engaged Doric columns above the granite plinth and flanking the three entrance doorways. Over these is an entablature that has balustraded balconies to the first floor level.

The ground floor contains the main banking chamber with a mezzanine level, partly renovated. Much of the plaster detailing in the chamber remains. The vestibule and adjoining lift lobby have finely figured marble linings. The second and third floors retain the original office layout and finishes, but other levels have been modified to accommodate larger tenancies. The relatively austere basement contains carefully detailed security grilles and a strong room.

As of 2015, the south-western upper wall has bank signage.

== Heritage listing ==
National Australia Bank was listed on the Queensland Heritage Register on 21 October 1992 having satisfied the following criteria.

The place is important in demonstrating the principal characteristics of a particular class of cultural places. The National Australia Bank is a fine example of a 1920s bank with Classical elements reflecting the solidity of a financial institution.

The place is important because of its aesthetic significance. The building is significant for its contribution to the streetscape in terms of style, scale, and texture, in conjunction with the adjoining Finney Isles & Co Building.
