= Tivoli Theatre, Brisbane =

Former theatre in Brisbane, Australia

Coordinates: 27.468462°S 153.023961°E

The Tivoli Theatre is a former theatre in Brisbane. It operated between 1914 until its closure in 1965 and demolition in 1969. It was situated opposite the Brisbane City Hall, in the site of the present King George Square.

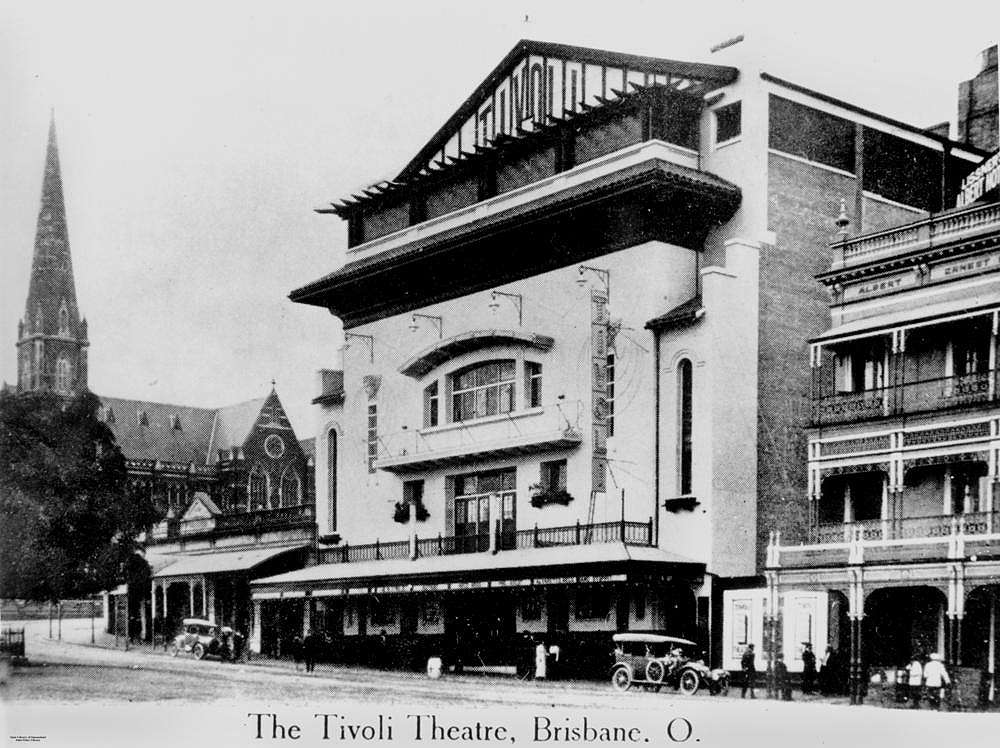
Tivoli Theatre Brisbane

== Construction ==
The Tivoli Theatre's construction began in Albert Street, Brisbane in 1914, on the site of the former Turkish baths. It was designed by architect Henry E. White in an Art Nouveau style and could house 1800 people on three levels. It was chilled by an air plant that could pump ice-cold air through the venue. It had ruby red carpets. It also featured a garden rooftop theatre holding 1200 with open sides for ventilation and steel shutters which could keep out rain. Its facade overlooking Albert Square had Oriental influences.

It opened on 15 May 1915 and featured a production of the Tivoli Follies in the auditorium and a vaudeville production in the rooftop theatre. These were staged by Hugh D. McIntosh, showman and promoter who was influential in the Rickard Tivoli circuit of Australia. It had a rival in vaudeville theatre the Empire Theatre also located in Albert Street which drew bigger crowds.

Smoking was permitted in the rooftop theatre. During Brisbane's hot summer months, the rooftop garden was meant to be more desirable. As the building had two entrances, it was possible for two production companies to co-exist on site with separate audiences as well. Films were later shown in both venues after the advent of talking films.

== Later renovations ==
Union Theatres Ltd. renovated the Tivoli Theatre in 1927 using Sydney architects Kaberry and Chard. This was to provide for more seating as the venue changed from a live theatre venue to that more suited to a film going audience. Two galleries were removed to make way for a single dress circle. With the onset of the Great Depression in the 1930s it was critical that the theatre could accommodate enough people to recover costs from cinema audiences as live theatre attendance dropped.

More renovations to the foyer and the auditorium took place in 1935.

== Demise of the Theatre ==
The Tivoli was purchased by the Brisbane City Council in 1963 and closed in 1965. The intended King George Square development led to a number of buildings being demolished, including Centennial Hall and the Hibernian Building.

Programs from the theatre are held in the Fryer Library of the University of Queensland.
