= Billo Smith =

Australian musician and bandleader

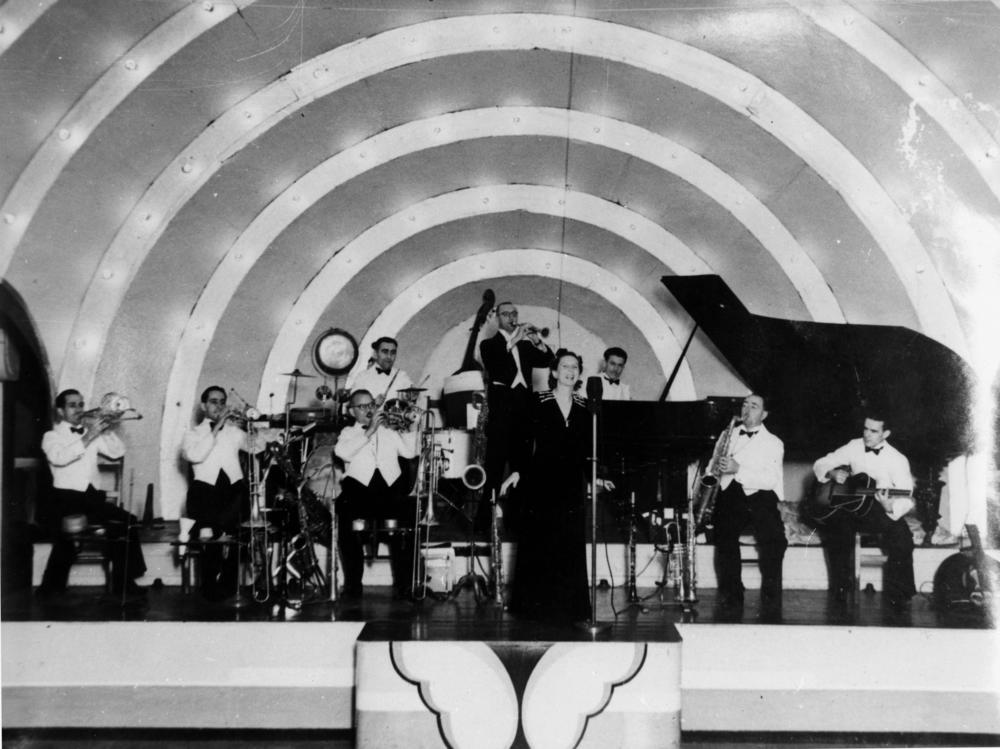
Billo Smith's Dance Band performing at the Trocadero dance hall, Brisbane, c.1943

Billo Smith is the stage name used by Australian musician and bandleader William David Smith (1897–1973) when he became leader of the Cloudland Dance Band after World War Two. Billo played clarinet and alto saxophone.

== Early life ==
Billo was born in Sydney, one of ten children born to Australian born parents. He lived most of his life in Brisbane, leaving Australia only during World War One, when he served in France as a member of the Australian Light Horse brigade. He was wounded in combat in 1916, suffering a shrapnel injury to his face, the left side of which was paralysed for the remainder of his life. He was honourably discharged.

Smith was married to Agnes "Nessie" Smith (1903–1982) who was also a member of the band as the pianist. They remained married for 45 years and had one son, William James Smith (born 1930) who is a clarinet and saxophone player, and band member throughout the 1950s. Billo Smith's son studied music at the Sydney Conservatorium; he also adopted the stage name 'Billo'.

== Career ==
Billo led a band at the Trocadero in Brisbane before and during World War Two.

Through the 1950s, Smith's band was the main act at the Cloudland Ballroom in Brisbane. He and his band, including Billo junior, played for Queen Elizabeth II for her coronation tour of Australia when she and Prince Philip visited Brisbane in 1952.(Photo and citation). The Royal Command Performance was held in the theatre of the Brisbane Town Hall. Billo Senior pulled a muscle as he began to conduct the band. Billo also played for the Duke of York (Later King George VI) in 1927 and the Duke of Gloucester on two occasions.

== Retirement ==
The Smiths retired from the band in 1960, and moved from Brisbane to the Gold Coast, firstly owning a block of flats at Kirra Beach, and then a living house on Razorback Hill overlooking Coolangatta (1968 until 1982). Smith remained involved in the Returned and Services League.

In retirement Smith seldom played his instrument. He had played for a few balls at the Empire Palais in Tweed Heads. Smith served as secretary of the Tweed Heads branch of the Lions Club. He was also a member of the Masonic Lodge in Brisbane, and later in Tweed Heads.
