= Luna Park, Melbourne =

Amusement park in Melbourne, Australia

Luna Park Melbourne

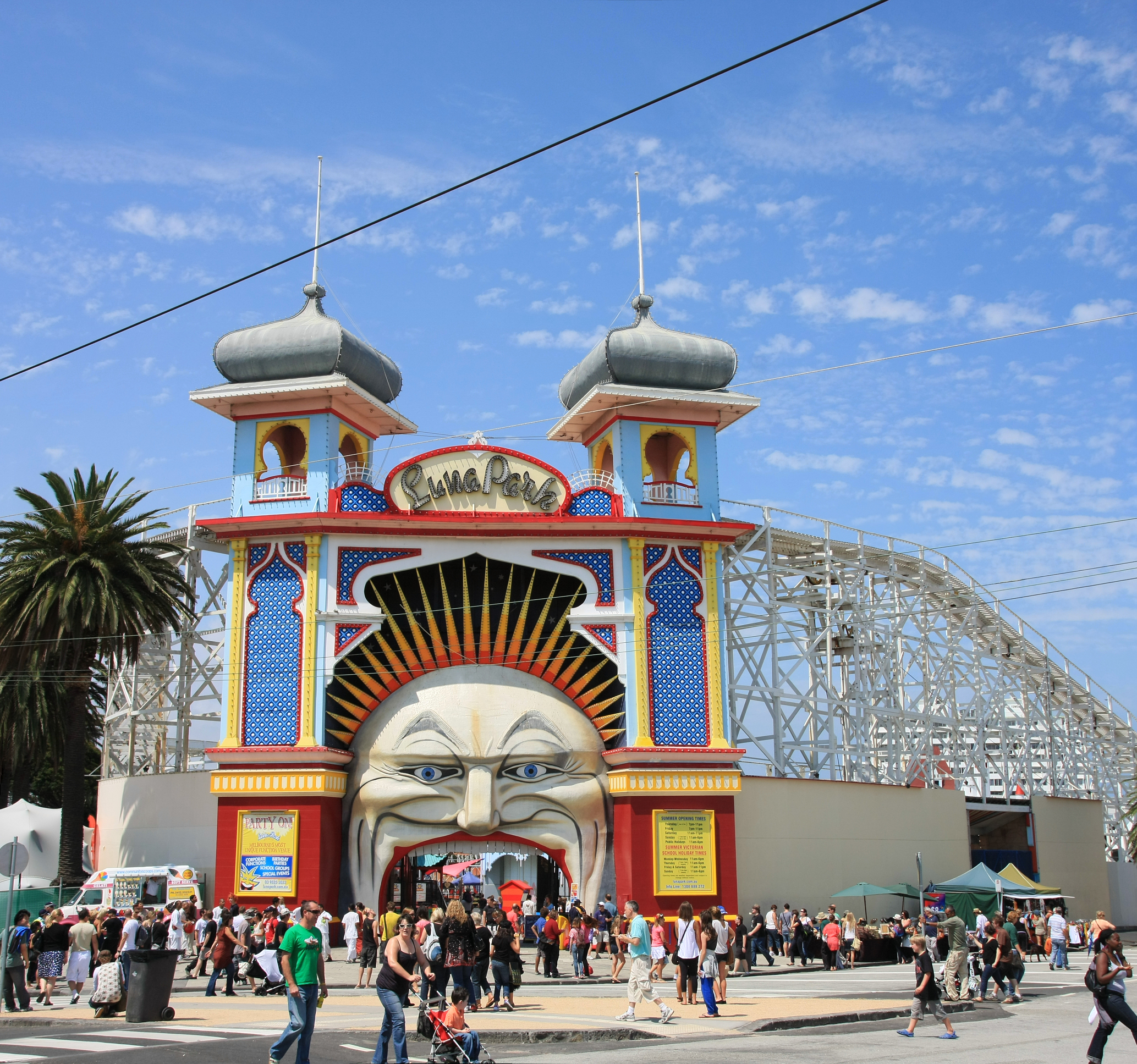
- The entrance to Luna Park
- Interactive map of Luna Park Melbourne
- Location: 18 Lower Esplanade, St. Kilda, Victoria, Australia
- Coordinates: 37.868036°S 144.976369°E
- Status: Operating
- Public transit: Luna Park/The Esplanade (#138): 16, 96; Bus routes 606, 623
- Opened: 13 December 1912; 113 years ago
- Owner: Linfox, Virtual Communities, and Liberty Petrol
- Slogan: Just For Fun
- Operating season: Year-round

Attractions
- Total: 20
- Roller coasters: 2
- Website: www.lunapark.com.au

Luna Park
- Interactive map of Luna Park

Victorian Heritage Register
- Official name: Luna Park
- Type: State Registered Place
- Designated: 20 August 1982; 44 years ago
- Reference no.: H0938
- Heritage Overlay numbers: HO76, HO454

Luna Park Melbourne is a historic amusement park located on the foreshore of Port Phillip Bay in St Kilda, Victoria, Australia. It opened on 13 December 1912, with a formal opening a week later, and has been operating almost continuously ever since.

== History ==
Luna Park was built by American showman J.D. Williams, together with the Phillips brothers Harold, Leon and Herman. Not much is known of their background, but they were involved in the building of picture theatres in Spokane, Washington and Vancouver before coming to Sydney in 1909 and quickly establishing a chain of luxury cinemas in that city and then Melbourne.

They then took the lease of the Dreamland site, a failed amusement park on the St Kilda foreshore, and reputedly brought out experts directly from the birthplace of the amusement park, Coney Island in New York, to build an up to date attraction. It was to be named Luna Park, perhaps after the first park of that name, the 1903 Luna Park on Coney Island, or Luna Park, Seattle, opened in 1906. Melbourne's Luna Park opened on 13 December 1912, to huge crowds and was an immediate success.

It is not clear exactly who designed the famous mouth entrance; T.S. Eslick is credited with the design of the park in the opening day brochure, and as the 'engineer-in-chief' in contemporary newspaper reports, while Vernon Churchill was described as the scenic artist "in whose fertile brain the various attractions have been arranged".

In the years before World War I, the park was a great success, with attractions such as the Scenic Railway, Palais de Folies (later Giggle Palace), River Caves of the World, Penny Arcade, a Whitney Bros 'while-u-wait' photo booth, the American Bowl Slide, as well as live performances in the Palace of Illusions and on a permanent high-wire. Williams returned to the US around 1913, and helped found First National Films which subsequently became Warner Brothers. The Phillips brothers stayed on and ran the park until their deaths in the 1950s.

Luna Park closed for the war, although the Scenic Railway continued to operate, and the park itself was still used for "patriotic or fund-raising events". It did not re-open until an extensive overhaul in 1923 added new and improved attractions, such as the Big Dipper roller coaster, a water chute, a Noah's Ark, and a four-row carousel made in 1913 by the Philadelphia Toboggan Company (that had previously been at White City in Sydney).

Between the wars, a number of new attractions were made, including dodgem cars in 1926–27, and in 1934, a ghost train. In the 1950s, the park was refurbished, including the addition of The Rotor in 1951. The park remained popular throughout the 1950s, 1960s and into the late 1970s, when some of the earlier attractions began to be replaced by modern mechanical rides. A fire in 1981 destroyed the Giggle Palace, and in the same year the River Caves were declared unsafe, and demolished. In 1989, the Big Dipper was demolished in anticipation of a new large roller coaster which never eventuated. The ride was also demolished due to safety concerns with its age, following a major derailment, that injured 20 people, on the older rollercoaster, the Scenic Railway.

The main historic features of the park to remain include the iconic "Mr Moon" face entry and flanking towers (1912, restored 1999), the Scenic Railway (1912), which is the oldest continuously operating roller coaster in the world, and the carousel (1913 restored 2000). Other historic attractions include the ghost train (1934), and the fairytale-castle-style dodgems building constructed to house the newly patented ride in 1927 (the ride itself was relocated from the first floor of this building to the ground level in the late 1990s).

The park also includes many modern attractions such as the Coney Drop, the Spider, a ferris wheel, and other mechanical thrill-rides. The park remains popular with children and their parents who have fond memories of the park from their youth.

The remaining 28 years of a 50 years lease for Luna Park was sold in 1998, when two superannuation funds represented by BCR Asset Management bought it for $3 million. They spent $10 million on extensive refurbishments, upgrading the services and safety for the first time in decades, upgrading existing rides and installing new ones, whilst retaining the fun-fair, fantasy themes. The Scenic Railway was overhauled, the face rebuilt, with a new fibreglass version placed over the remnants of the original plaster one, and the towers repainted in their traditional primary colours. The carousel was also restored, returning the horses and the painted decoration to their original 1913 appearance.

A consortium headed by Melbourne transport magnate Lindsay Fox bought Luna Park in early 2005, pledging to restore it to the glory he remembers from his 1940s youth, spent in nearby Windsor. As of 2021, none of these plans have come to fruition, but the Scenic Railway Station was given a facelift. Between December 2007 and June 2008, a major section of the Scenic Railway underwent major repairs and in 2010 the Coney Island Top Drop (a replica of Coney Tower at Coney Island's Luna Park) was purchased directly from Zamperla.

The park's triangular beachfront site is on government land, bounded by the O'Donnell Gardens on one side and Cavell Street on the other. Across this street is a larger triangle of foreshore crown land known as the 'Triangle Site', occupied by the grand 1920s Palais Theatre, the 1970s Palace nightclub (burned down in 2007), and car parking. The City of Port Phillip, in consultation with the Victorian State Government, ran a tender process in 2007 to restore the Palais Theatre and redevelop the remainder of the site. Lindsay Fox was part of a consortium that submitted a proposal which was unsuccessful.

The remaining heritage features of the park are listed on the National Trust of Australia, and the face and towers and Scenic Railway, and the carousel and its canopy, are listed on the Victorian Heritage Register.

On 13 December 2012, the park celebrated its centenary. In August 2013, it was announced that a new permanent thrill ride would be installed in the coming months. The ride replaced the G-Force and was revealed to be a permanent installation of the Power Surge, which had previously been a seasonal ride.

In 2014–15 the 'House of Carnivale' was built in the site that had once been the Jack'n'Jill, and later the Pinball Arcade, with food venues on the ground level and a function room upstairs. This was the first permanent building on the Luna Park site since the ghost train in 1936.

== Other Luna Parks ==
Luna Park in St Kilda spawned three other Luna Parks that were eventually built or planned around Australia, and there were another two places that used the name.

In 1930 the Phillips brothers branched out and built a second Luna Park in the Adelaide suburb of Glenelg, managed by David Atkins. The Glenelg park had an exact clone of Melbourne's Big Dipper that operated at Sydney until 1979. In the face of Council's refusal to lower the rental, and local opposition, when a site in Sydney became available in Milsons Point, Sydney, they dismantled the rides and relocated the venture. With a new face entrance and a version of the Giggle Palace called Coney Island, Luna Park Sydney was an immediate success, and still operates, albeit with the loss of most original rides.

In 1938 Tollemache Eslick reappeared in Australia and built the Cloudland Ballroom which was originally called Luna Park, and had a few rides clustered around it. World War II intervened, and the park was soon closed, with the ballroom reopening in 1942 to become a popular part of the Brisbane entertainment scene until its shock demolition in 1982.

In 1944 a small cluster of amusements on the foreshore of the seaside Brisbane suburb of Redcliffe adopted the name Luna Park, and operated until the last ride closed in the late 1960s.

Another collection of rides, complete with a much-simplified version of the mouth entrance, opened in the Perth suburb of Scarborough in 1939. It lasted 33 years before being demolished in 1972 for a shopping centre.

== Rides ==
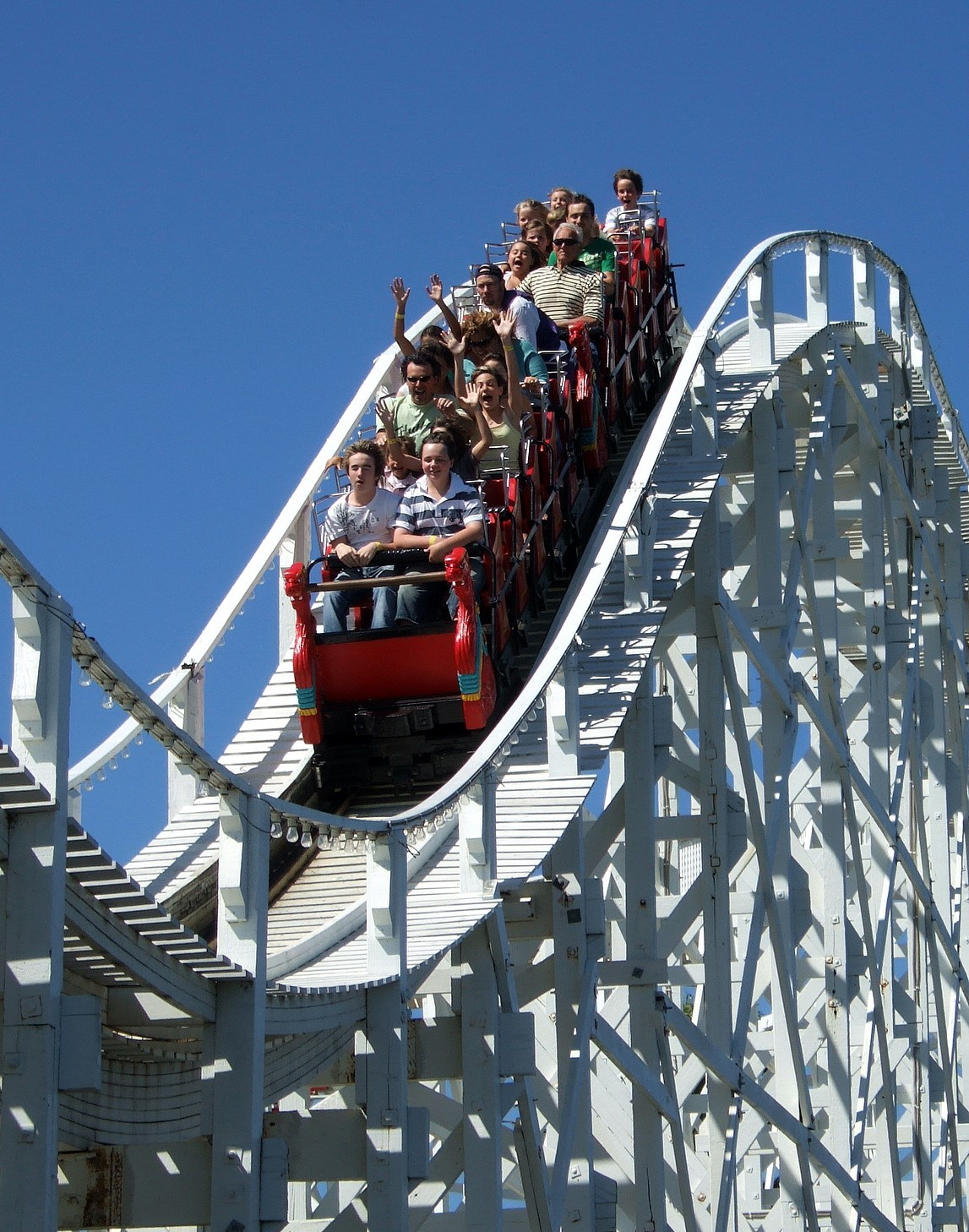
The Scenic Railway, is the world's oldest continually operating roller coaster.

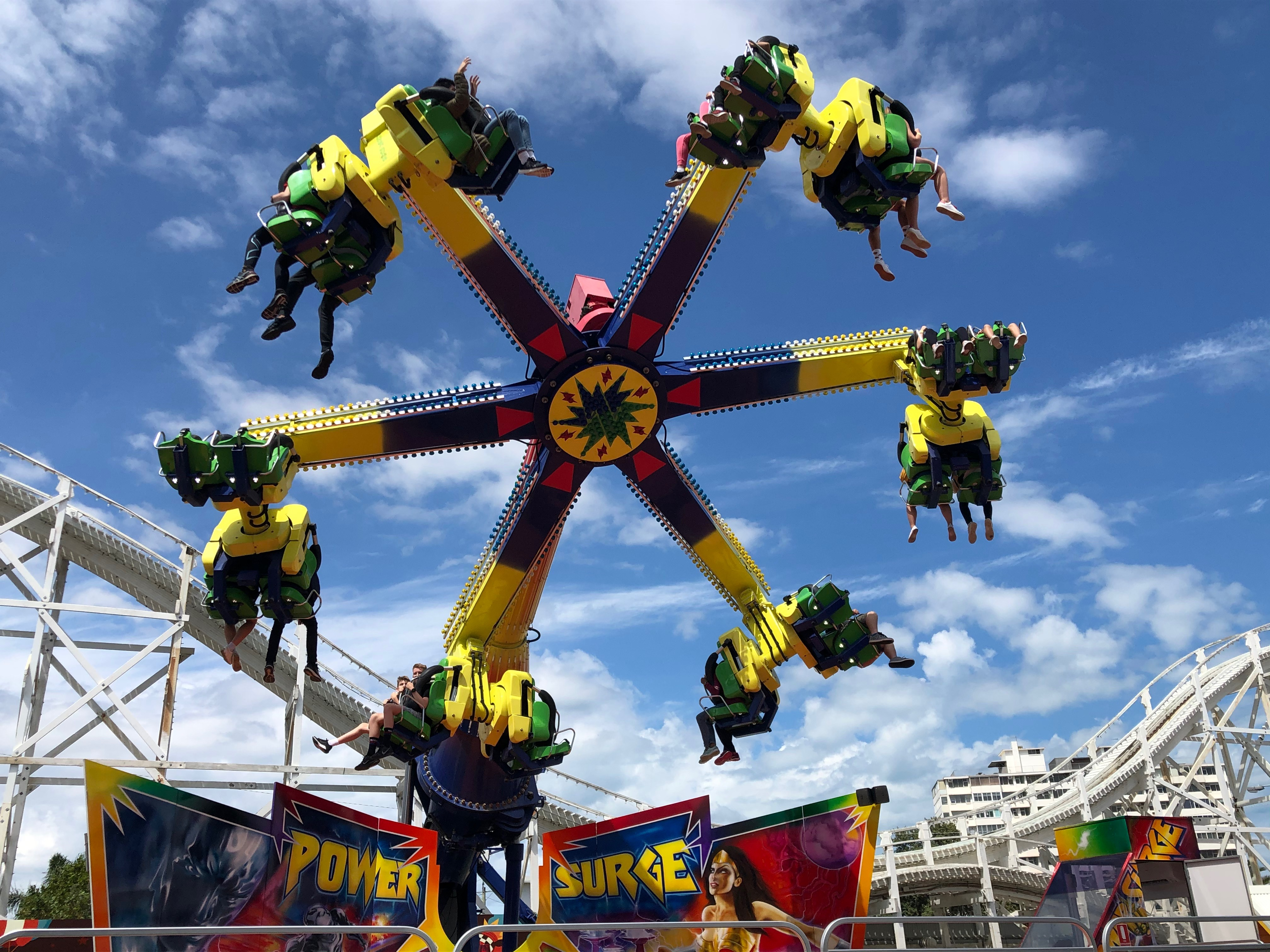
The Power Surge

=== Current Rides ===
The following are all permanent rides at Luna Park Melbourne as of 2025
- The Great Scenic Railway – A Scenic Railway designed by L.A. Thompson. Opened in December 1912, the Scenic Railway is the oldest continually operating roller coaster in the world, and a rare surviving example of a rollercoaster that requires a brakeman to stand in the middle of the train. For these reasons, it is regarded as an ACE Coaster Classic.
- Sky Rider – Ferris Wheel installed in 1971
- Twin Dragon – A Pirate ship type ride installed 2001
- Supernova – A Skyflyer attraction installed in 2019
- The Ghost Train – A vintage ghost train attraction that was originally opened in 1934.
- Dodgems – A Dodgem track opened in 2001
- The Enterprise – A HUSS Enterprise installed 1993, built 1979.
- Coney Drop – A Zamperla Sky Tower 15.
- Carousel – A heritage carousel built in 1913 by the Philadelphia Toboggan Company in the United States. The ride originally operated at White City in Sydney before arriving at Luna Park for its reopening in 1923. The ride received an extensive restoration between 1999-2001 at a cost of $3 million.
- Spider – An Octopus installed in 1983
- Pharaoh's Curse – An inverting double pendulum installed in 2001
- The Power Surge – A Zamperla Power Surge permanently installed in 2013. Previously a seasonally operated ride.
- Speedy Beetle – SBF Visa Spinning Family Coaster opened in 2019. Replaced the aging Silly Serpent ride.
- The Road Runner – Built 2017, rotary slide ride.
- Betty Choo Choo – Trackless train.
- Happy Swing – Built in 2020, a Zamperla Happy Swing.
- Moon Balloons – Zampera Mini Ferris Wheel
- Arabian Merry – Children's ride installed in 2001.
- Red Baron – Children's ride installed in 2001.

=== Previous rides of note ===
Removed rides that are of significance, or are in recent public memory.

- Giggle Palace – A funhouse that opened with the park in 1912. Also known as the Palais de Folies or Funnyland, it contained attractions reminiscent of Luna Park Sydney's Coney Island, including the Turkey Trot, revolving barrels, a mirror maze and wooden slides, as well as a photographic studio. The building was destroyed by fire on the 27 November 1981.
- River Caves – An Old Mill ride that opened in 1912. The ride was closed for inspections in 1980 in response to the fire in Luna Park Sydney's Ghost Train, deemed unsafe, and demolished in 1981.
- Big Dipper – A wooden coaster designed by American company Miller & Baker Inc, opening in 1923. A clone of the ride operated at Luna Park Glenelg and later Luna Park Sydney. The ride was closed in 1989, with the park citing that upkeep had become too expensive.
- Rotor – Opened in 1951, inspired by the success of Luna Park Sydney's Rotor. The ride operated until 1977 when it was replaced by a Wipeout named UFO.
- Gravitron – A modern take on the Rotor Opening in 1984, removed in 2000.
- Metropolis – An S.D.C. Galaxi rollercoaster that operated from 1990 to 2012.
- Silly Serpent / Dragon – Zamperla Powered Kiddie coaster. Opened in 1989, closed in 2019 to be replaced by Speedy Beetle.
- G Force / Disco Swing – A Reverchon Explorer. Opened in 1985, closed in 2010.

== Photo gallery ==
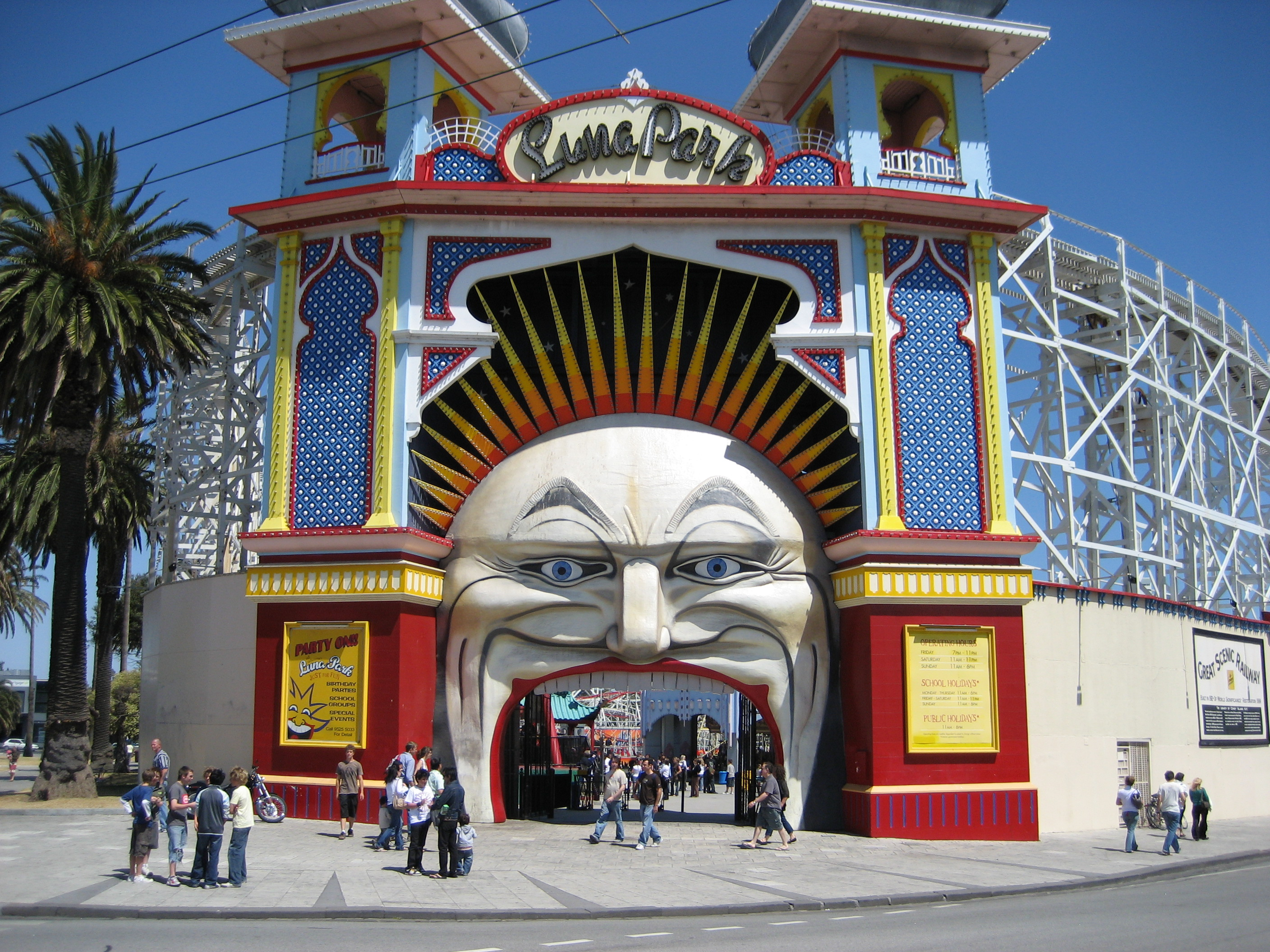
Entrance

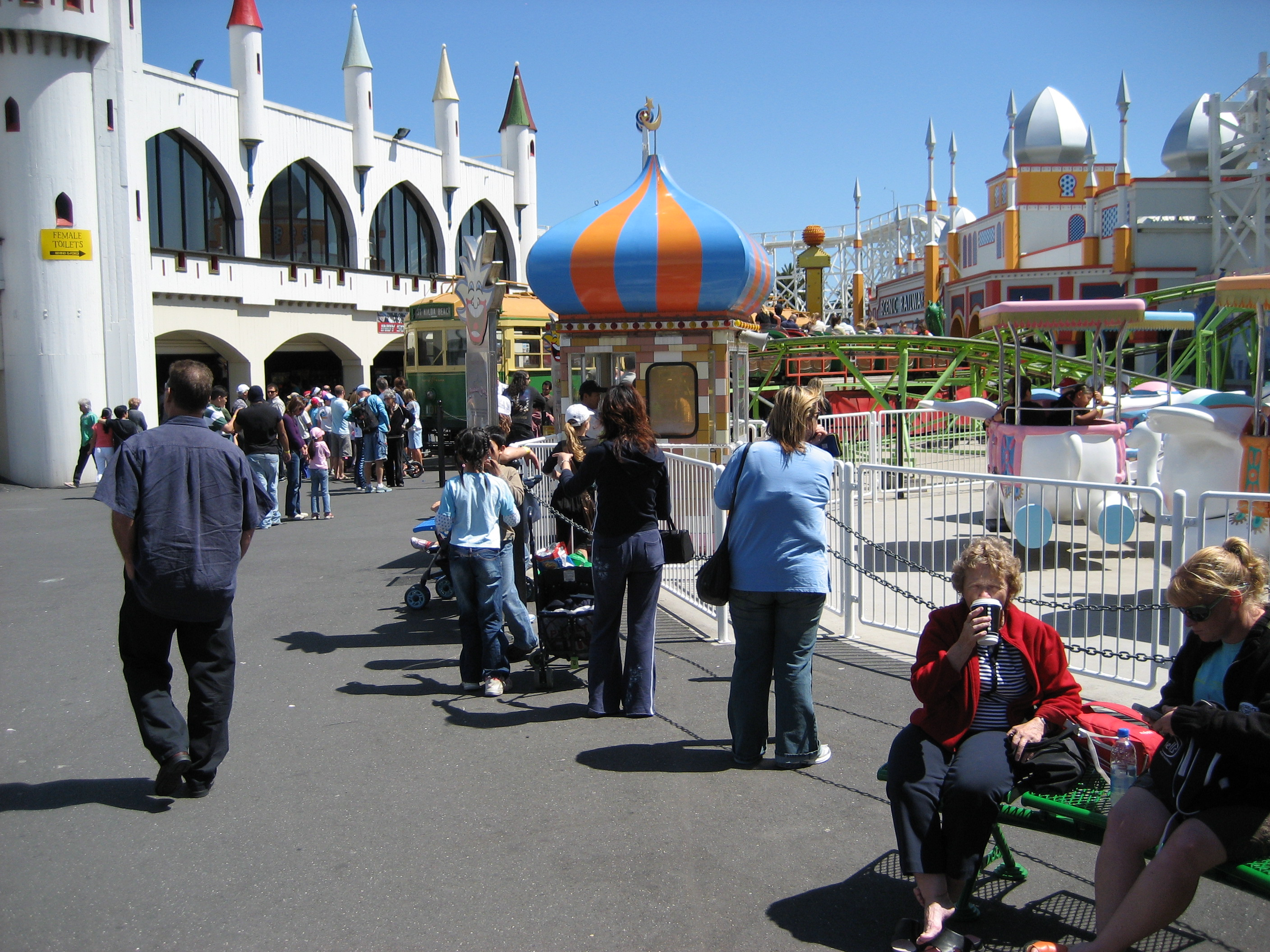
Inside Luna Park

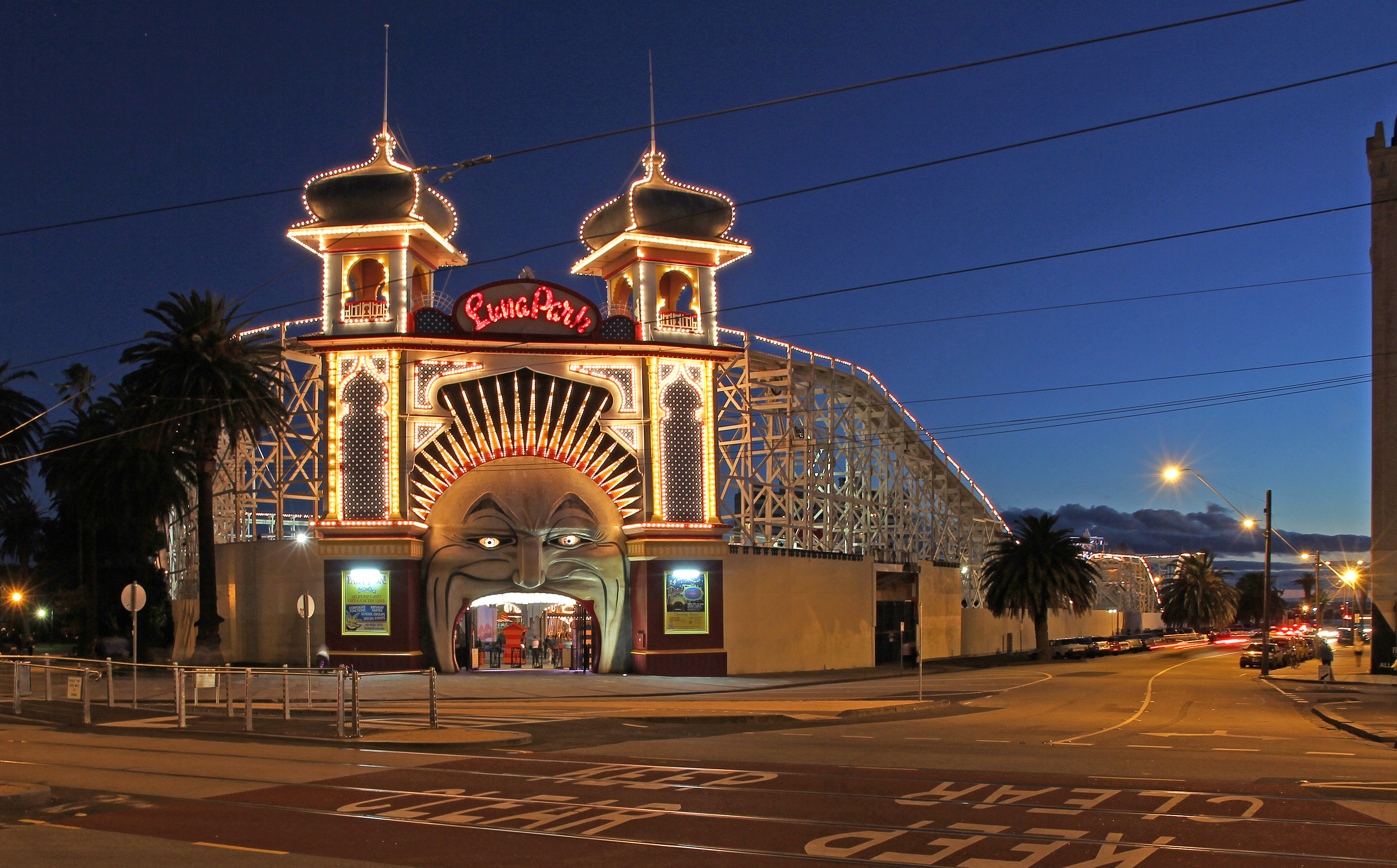
Entrance at dusk

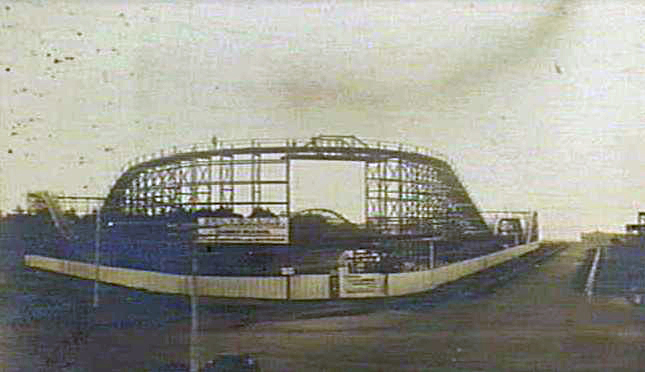
The construction of Luna Park in 1912
