= Cloudland =

Entertainment venue in Brisbane, Australia

Coordinates: 27°26′51.60″S 153°02′26.22″E

Cloudland Ballroom
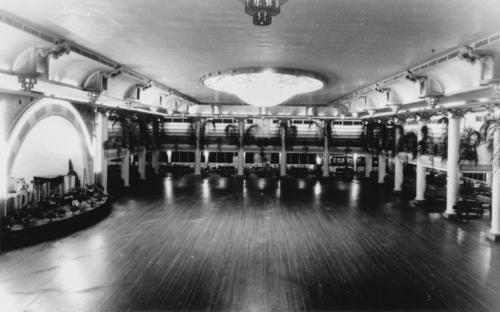
- Interior of Cloudland Dance Hall, c. 1950
- Interactive map of the Cloudland Ballroom area
- Former names: Luna Park

General information
- Status: Demolished
- Location: Brisbane, Bowen Hills, Australia
- Construction started: 1939
- Completed: 1940
- Demolished: 7 November 1982

Technical details
- Floor count: 2

Design and construction
- Architect: Adolphus Parry-Fielder

The Cloudland Dance Hall, originally called Luna Park, was a famous entertainment venue located in Bowen Hills, Brisbane, Queensland, Australia. It was demolished in 1982 and the site was subsequently developed into an apartment complex.

On its hilltop site above Brisbane, Cloudland's distinctive parabolic laminated roof arch, nearly 18 metres (59 ft) high, was highly visible. A funicular railway ran from the main road straight up the steep part of the hill and provided easy access to the ballroom site. The funicular was dismantled in 1967 and the area was turned into a car park. Cloudland was the venue for numerous formal balls, concerts, weekend dances, civic events, school and university examinations and, later, a marketplace.

== History ==
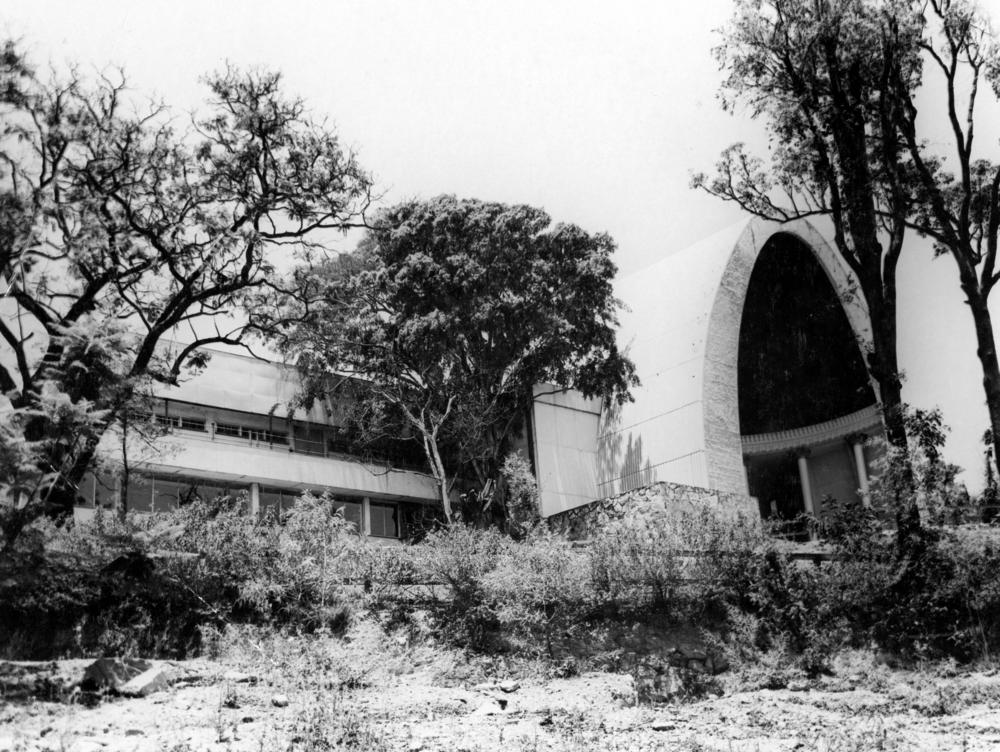
Side view of Cloudland, 1946

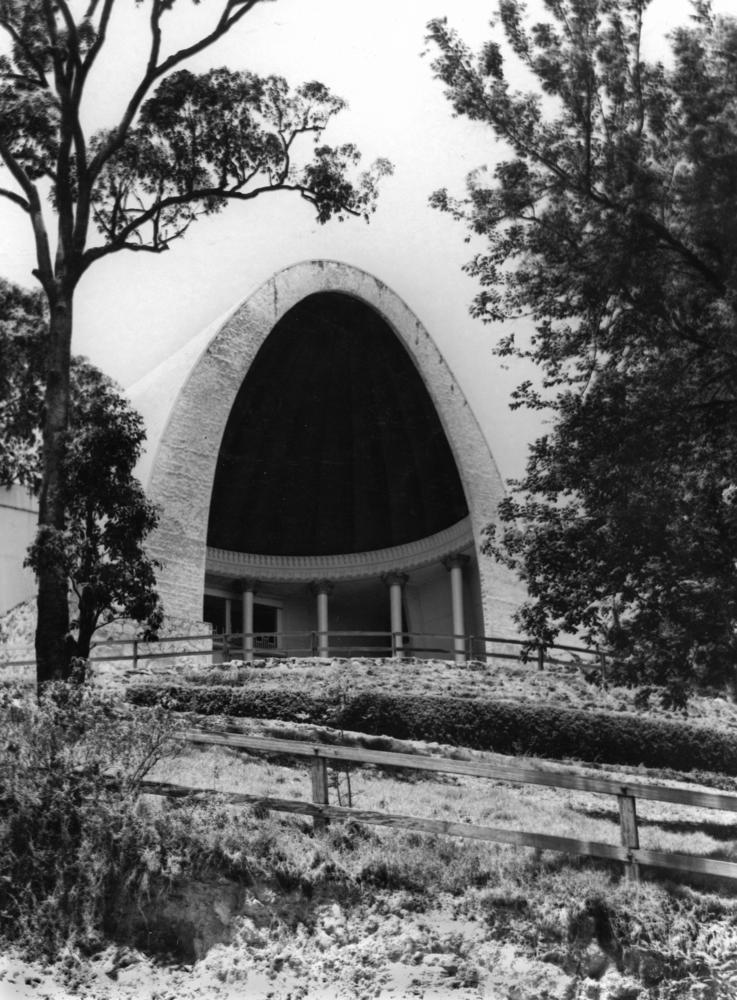
Arched entrance in 1946

Purchased in June 1938 for £50,000 on the crest of Montpelier Heights at 150 feet (46 m), the 6.5-acre (2.6 ha) site was to be Brisbane's Luna Park. The area was constructed in 1939–40, by T. S. Eslick and opened on 2 August 1940. Eslick paid particular attention to the dance floor. He wanted to create the "best ballroom in the Southern Hemisphere". Queensland timbers were used throughout. The ballroom was modelled on the La Monica ballroom in Santa Monica, California, designed and built by Eslick in 1924.

A funicular railway ran up the side of the hill from the tram stop on Breakfast Creek Road carrying passengers to the rear of the ballroom. The dual-track railway, powered by 50-horsepower electric motors, were for those not seeking to climb the winding 'rural' track; met by a large Poinciana tree preserved at the hilltop car entrance. The site was originally intended to have a fun park like Luna Park in Melbourne, which Eslick had built in 1912. The fun park was not built by the time World War II began. It was the largest building of its type in Brisbane, and the largest dance hall in Australia; with 34,000 square feet (3,200 m^{2}) capable of accommodating 1,000 couples dancing, 1,000 in the loges around the floor, and 2,000 in the galleries above. The Breakfast Creek Road main entrance had two 70-foot (21 m) trees at the foot of the hill, and a blaze of light sweeping back onto the hill, based on the Elephant Tower entrance to the San Francisco World's Fair.

A fortnight from its opening had seen 19,000 dancers on the floor, with old-style, new-vogue and modern dancing, with music provided by Billy Romaine and his Luna Park Orchestra; as well as a champion dance team, and entertainers Billy Williams and Ted Fitzsimmons. The amusement park was also in operation.

Eslick disappeared soon after Cloudland was opened so the building was left abandoned until 1942 when it was used by the American military. They arrived shortly after Pearl Harbor was bombed in December 1941. When Cloudland was re-opened after the war, the name Luna Park was dropped and the building was thenceforth known as Cloudland Ballroom. As a gift to the people of Brisbane, the dance floor was rebuilt by the US military. The smooth hard floor was constructed of 1-inch (25 mm) tongue and groove boards that ran the length of the ballroom. The close-fitting narrow boards were not nailed. The floor area reserved for dancing sat on huge, metal coil springs placed uniformly underneath the bearers so that dancers could feel and see the movement of the boards beneath their feet.

Other features of the interior were huge decorative columns, sweeping curtains, domed sky lights and chandeliers. The dance floor was framed by private alcoves, decorative curtains, a domed skylights and chandeliers. Cloudland also had an upper circle of tiered seating which overlooked the floor and stage. An impressive tall domed entrance which features a wide, white, 18-metre-tall (59 ft) arch was also visible from surrounding suburbs.

Cloudland was purchased by sisters Mya Winters & Francis Rouch for £16,000 and re-opened on 24 April 1947.

== Performances ==
As a pop/rock/old time music venue Cloudland hosted thousands of dances and concerts in the 1950s, 1960s and 1970s, including a number of notable events. It hosted three of the six concerts performed by rock 'n' roll legend Buddy Holly on his only Australian tour in February 1958. Early 1960s saw Saturday afternoon rock and roll dances sponsored by Coca Cola and was known as 'the hi fi club' the resident band were 'the hucklebucks', with 'the planets' and 'the dominos' alternating saturdays. A talent quest held most Saturdays produced some future famous faces including the 'bee gees' among others.

Cloudland also hosted fledgling bands who went on to establish careers in the music industry. One example is the concert of 28 July 1979 featuring three talented up-and-coming bands: XTC, Flowers (later known as Icehouse), and The Numbers. Australian and New Zealand bands who played at the venue include AC/DC on their "TNT Tour" (November 30, 1975), The Angels, Australian Crawl, Cold Chisel, Dragon, The Go Betweens, Icehouse (as Flowers), INXS, Mental As Anything, Railroad Gin, The Riptides, The Saints, Skyhooks, Split Enz and The Sports.

International bands which played at the venue include Dr. Feelgood (July 13, 1979), XTC (July 28, 1979), Madness (May 2, 1981), The Stray Cats (October 3, 1981), Echo & The Bunnymen (November 13, 1981), Simple Minds (November 28, 1981 and October 9, 1982), The Clash (February 20, 1982) and The Teardrop Explodes (March 19, 1982).

Music for Cloudland functions was provided by Brisbane musicians and Australian bands from the 1950s to the early 1980s, and for much of the 1960s it was the central venue for the Sunshine group. Sunshine was headed by Brisbane businessman Ivan Dayman (originally from Adelaide), who leased Cloudland from Apel around 1963. Dayman's entrepreneurial style had a formula that had proved successful in Adelaide and he applied this to his Cloudland enterprise. He commissioned arrangements of the latest pop tunes (hit parades/top forty) adapted to the dances of the day, headhunted the best of Brisbane's musicians and performing artists and paid for rehearsals and dances were run during the week as well as on weekends. On public holidays and significant dates or long weekends during the year, midnight-to-dawn dances were run, usually with featured guest artists of national fame, for example, the Bee Gees, Little Pattie and Midnight Oil. Dayman also installed a huge mirror ball over the centre of the ballroom's floor.

The dance steps comprised 40% old time and 60% modern music. Music for the dancers was provided by resident bands and vocal performers from the time of Cloudland's reopening after the war until its closure. Resident bands included The Billo Smith Orchestra, The Cloudland Big Band, The Rick Farbach Sextet, Jim Diamond & The Lancers, The Hi-Marks, The Sounds of Seven, and The Seasons of the Witch. The dance programs in those times covered old time (barn dance, gypsy tap, Canadian 3-step, Pride of Erin, old time waltz; and in a roped off area at one end of the ballroom, jive), 'Modern' (jazz waltz, quickstep, foxtrot), and later the twist and other popular dance crazes. Cloudland Ballroom was said to be the finest ballroom in Australia.

== Other functions ==
On 2 September 1948 Laurence Olivier and Vivien Leigh visited after doing the play School for Scandal for a débutants ball for the "Royal Society of Saint George".

The venue was also used for many balls including the Engineers' Ball (1947), Masonic Ball (1949), Pharmacy Ball (1949), Combined Grammar Schools' Ball (1950), Cinderella Ball organised by the Incapacitated Sailors, Soldiers and Airmen's Association (1951), United Service Club Ball (1951), Grand Scottish debutantes ball (1951), combined Church of England/Saint Margaret's Ball (1953), and the Royal Society of Saint George ball (1954).

Cloudland was later a Sunday markets and an exam venue by the University of Queensland.

== Demolition ==
Despite strenuous public calls for its preservation, the building was demolished overnight on 7 November 1982 to make way for an apartment complex. The demolition was done by the Deen Brothers, a demolition company often used by the state government, the Brisbane City Council and the "white shoe brigade" for controversial demolition projects. The demolition took place despite there being no permit and in spite of its National Trust listing.

== Legacy ==
Midnight Oil, who had played at Cloudland many times, immortalised the demolition in their song "Dreamworld" (from the Diesel and Dust LP) which attacked the greed of the pro-development forces. In 2004, a ballet Cloudland choreographed by Francois Klaus was premiered at the Brisbane Festival, and has since been performed in a number of Australian and European cities. A sculpture in Cowlishaw Street, Bowen Hills, is called Cloudland Memorial Arch and was created by Jamie Maclean.

In 2009 as part of the Q150 celebrations, the demolition of Cloudland was announced as one of the Q150 Icons of Queensland for its role as a 'defining moment'.

== Namesake ==
The name of this venue was used in 2009 by a new Brisbane nightclub located approximately 1.5 kilometres (0.93 mi) away, in Fortitude Valley.

== See also ==
- History of Brisbane
- List of destroyed heritage
- Billo Smith, a main act during the 1950s
