= Tollemache Heriot Eslick =

English-born amusement park engineer

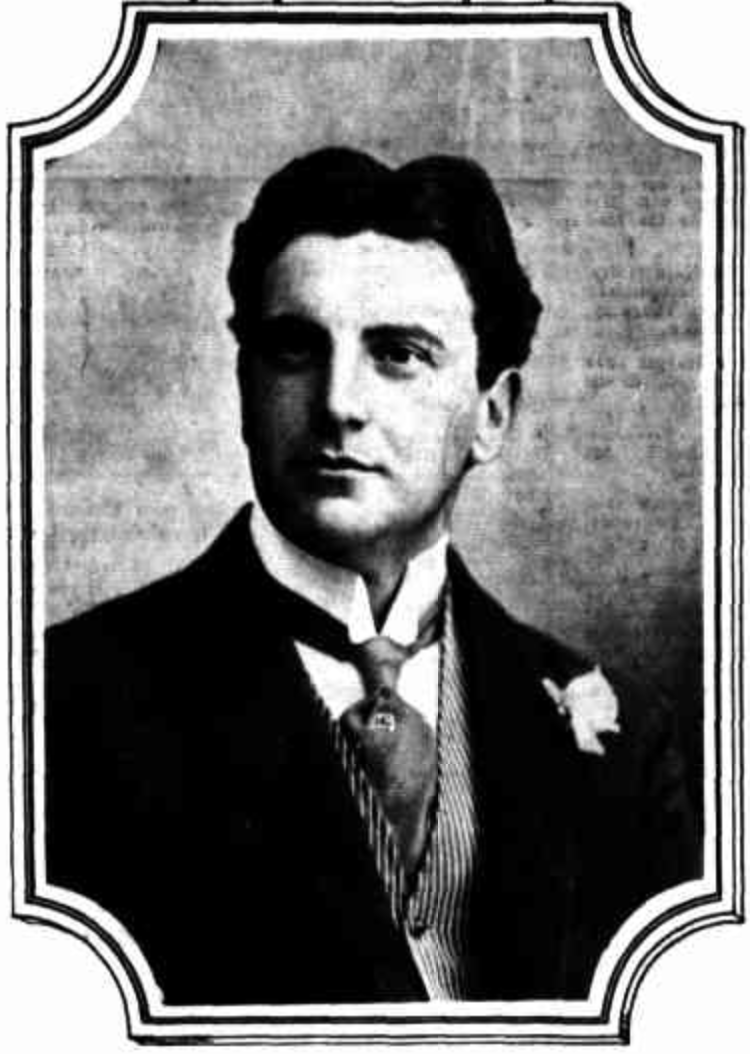
- Eslick in 1912
- Born: 23 May 1877; Great Britain
- Died: 1948; Oregon
- Other name: T. H. Eslick; Thomas Henry Eslick
- Occupation: Amusement park engineer
- Known for: Designer of the La Monica Ballroom, US, and Cloudland Ballroom, Australia; Twice-bankrupt
- Spouse(s): First wife (her death, 1924); Florence
- Children: Inez Eslick; Esme Eslick; Charles Theile (step-son, second marriage)

Tollemache Heriot Eslick (1877–1948), more commonly known as T. H. Eslick, who also used the name Thomas Henry Eslick, was a twice-bankrupt showman, prone to exaggeration, who indicated he was an English-born construction engineer specialising in amusement parks and ballrooms. He was given to be a "bluff and good natured Cornishman with a hearty sense of humour and a ready wit", taller than 6 feet (1.8 m), and of good health. Not much has been independently written of Eslick, and much information derived from newspaper interviews – the entrepreneur indicating in 1914 he was born in India, contrasting with his usual stated English origins.

== Early life ==
Eslick indicated he was born on 23 May 1877 at Aberdare, Glamorganshire, Wales, to British parents.

By his own words, his father was a Wesleyan minister, educated at Saint Augustine's College, Liverpool, trained in architecture and engineering in Liverpool, England, and met his wife in Blackpool, England.

In 1914, while managing the White City Amusement Park, he lived with his wife, "a highly-cultural Englishwoman" and daughters Inez and Esme.

His first wife died in England in 1924, and he married his second wife Florence (23 June 1893–?) in Walla Walla, Oregon, United States of America. (Note: Walla Walla is in Washington State, while Eslink indicated he was married in Walla Walla, Oregon.) She held and continued to hold American citizenship. She had a son, Charles Theile, given to reside at Commonwealth Parade, Manly, Sydney in 1941. Theile was an electrician.

== Career ==
Examples of Eslick's involvements included:

- 1912 Luna Park (Melbourne, Australia), supervised by John Monash (1865–1931)
- 1913–1917 White City Amusement Park (Sydney, Australia).
- 1924–1963 La Monica ballroom (Santa Monica, California, US)
- 1930 Lotus Isle Amusement Park and Peacock Ballroom dance hall, Portland, Oregon, as manager
- 1938 Cloudland (Brisbane, Australia), originally to be Brisbane's Luna Park, where the ballroom was based on the La Monica ballroom. War conditions impacted the construction completion.

Although not substantiated, it is indicated Eslick was also involved the design and building of original motion picture sound studios at Elstree, London, England

It was fixing a 100 feet (30 m) revolving circular water tank at a tourist attraction at South Shore, Blackpool that led him to his specialty in engineering. Around this time he went to America, giving him a slight American accent, where he visited the Coney Island amusement parks in New York, and stayed in New York for five years apprenticed to L. A. Thompson (1848–1919); before returning to England in 1906 to work with American George Arthur Lawsha, as the assistant engineer for a scenic railway at Blackpool.

Work took him to the Franco-British Exhibition in Shepherd's Bush, London, where he worked with building a royal scenic railway, with Lawsha and John Henry Isles, prior to 1908. Queen Alexandra was one of the first to ride this railway. His third scenic railway effort was at New Brighton, before moving onto amusement parks. The Exposition Internationale at Nancy, France, was followed by the Edinburgh Marine Gardens (1909–1939).

At one time, he was going a weekly triangular journey between London, Paris and Vienna, for five months. When visiting Russia by train, he was also detained for having plans thought to be of fortresses.

Around 1911 Eslick stated he was appointed Director-General for the Royal Indian Durbar Exhibition which he indicated was in Bombay whereas it was actually held in Delhi. He then contracted malaria leading to enteric fever.

His movements are little known, but given as:

- February 1912, coming from India, in Melbourne, Australia for the Luna Park construction
- after the collapse of White City, Eslick restarted business in December 1917 with Sydney's Palladium. He sought to reassure people he had not committed suicide, had gone bankrupt, had gone to America with White City's monthly takings, prohibited from running a business, or was in gaol
- c. 1918, in Brisbane, building some theatres in "north coastal cities"
- 1920, organised the Automotive Show in Adelaide, Australia, while also involved with the Royal Palais de Danse, Adelaide. While in Adelaide, he proposed park entertainment near the Adelaide Oval and the River Torrens, with a scenic railway
- 1922, left Australia
- 1926, listed in the London Gazette for the Bankruptcy Act 1914, as residing at 48 Rupert Street, London
- 1938 to 1942, back in Brisbane for the Luna Park construction. In January 1941 be advertised for an adventure to establish a Pacific Island Paradise, before being bankrupt by late 1942.

In November 1942 he separately stated before a court that he had returned to Australia on a five-year contract to establish a system of music teaching, sold his contract after six weeks, and sought to establish "perambulating cafes" in Sydney; then was to do a wax-works show, before being invited to Brisbane to put up an amusement park in Brisbane. In June 1941 he resigned and left Brisbane in twenty-four hours and returned to Sydney where he worked with the Manly Amusement Pier. It was also noted around the same period that he had relinquished his interest in the Manly Pier and was conducting either a picture theatre or a hotel in a Sydney suburb.

== Later life ==
From October 1941 to July 1942 during World War II, Eslick was subject to investigation. By November 1941 one report indicated "Eslick not now connected with Luna Park [Brisbane], as Shareholders refused to supply any more money for his profligate spending", and that "it is considered most probable that a number of people who were associated with him in that venture [Luna Park, Brisbane], would be interested in his present whereabouts". It was later noted his given address of Flat 8, Roslyn Hall, Commonwealth Parade, Manly, Sydney had commanding views of the North Head military barracks; whilst he was living in Brisbane. While not noted by friends as subversive, he had "a poor reputation for business dealings", and opinions of him is "not flattering". Eslick had also claimed to have served in the Second Boer War (1897–1902) with the British Forces, although this was doubted.

If it is to be believed, Eslick the amusement architect claimed he had lost £22000 in Brussels about 1922, as well as a £43000 in a fixed deposit in a California bank crash; giving him no assets and liabilities of £1382 when before the Federal bankruptcy court in Brisbane in November 1942. He claimed ill-health of osteoarthritis in both knees and other complaints, was unfit to travel, and sought a debt discharge; for which it was noted that Eslick could not travel from Sydney to Brisbane, yet intended to travel to the US. The matter was still active in December 1945, where creditors were seeking a total of £982. Unsecured creditor liabilities amounted to £1382. Eslink was now aged 69, and his wife Florence wanted to return to the US as she felt a stranger in Australia.

While commencing an autobiography, it appears this has never been published. Eslick listed his qualifications as the Member of the Institute of Civil Engineers (London), Institute of Civil Engineers (India), Institute of Civil Engineers of New Zealand, and 'IIJ'; and a member of the Académie Française.
