= Brian Heenan =

Australian Roman Catholic bishop

- Bishop Emeritus of Rockhampton
- Church: Catholic Church
- Diocese: Diocese of Rockhampton
- In office: 23 July 1991 – 1 October 2013
- Predecessor: Bernard Joseph Wallace
- Successor: Michael McCarthy

Orders
- Ordination: 29 June 1962 by Patrick Mary O'Donnell
- Consecration: 25 September 1991 by Francis Roberts Rush

Personal details
- Born: 4 August 1937 (age 89) Ashgrove, Brisbane, Queensland, Australia, British Empire

Brian Heenan (born 4 August 1937) is a retired Australian Roman Catholic bishop.

== Early life ==
Heenan was born on 4 August 1937, and grew up in Ashgrove, in Brisbane. He attended Marist College Ashgrove as a day student. After completing high school, he entered Pius XII Provincial Seminary in Banyo to studied for the priesthood.

== Priesthood ==
Heenan was ordained a priest for the Archdiocese of Brisbane on 29 June 1962 at Cathedral of St Stephen, Brisbane by Archbishop Patrick Mary O'Donnell.

His first appointment was as an assistant priest at Dutton Park. He served in various other parishes over the next few years. In 1977, he was appointed parish priest of Zillmere and chaplain of St Joseph's College, Nudgee. He was then appointed Director of Continuing Education for the clergy of the Archdiocese of Brisbane.

== Episcopate ==
On 23 July 1991, Heenan was appointed Bishop of Rockhampton by Pope John Paul II. He was consecrated a bishop on 25 September 1991 by Archbishop Francis Roberts Rush.

As bishop, he was particularly keen to ensure the voice of all members of the Diocese were heard as it related to Diocesan affairs. One of his strongest gifts was his pastoral ministry. His care and concern for one and all was evident in his care of the Diocese over his 22 year episcopate. He also aimed to train and educate local communities, and encourage the laity into active ministry.

In 1993, Heenan dispensed all Catholics in his Diocese from their Sunday obligation for a weekend after asking all the priests of the Diocese to join him for a 12-day "in-service", effectively meaning no masses could be celebrated in the Diocese during this time. He was a proponent of the more ordinary use of the Sacrament of Reconciliation in the Third Rite, leaving it up to his priests on how and when they might use it, although he was forced to come down more harshly on this practice in late 1999 following a meeting of the Australian Catholic Bishops.

The Diocese of Rockhampton had suffered a severe decline in vocations during the 1980s and this continued under Heenan's episcopate. During his 22 years in charge of the Diocese, only five men were ordained to the priesthood. He also lowered the age of priestly retirement from 75 to 70 in his Diocese and opposed the use of priests from overseas. He was forced to consolidate many parishes due to a diminishing number of priests so ministry could be carried out more effectively. By 2010, he had changed his perspective however and had travelled to India to recruit new priests for his Diocese.

In 2012, he completed a $6 million restoration of the landmark St Joseph's Cathedral, Rockhampton.

== Retirement ==
Heenan tendered his resignation upon turning 75 on 4 August 2012, however it was not initially accepted. On 1 October 2013, the resignation was accepted without a replacement being appointed. He moved to a family-owned house in Caloundra following his retirement.

In 2015, he appeared before the Royal Commission into Institutional Responses to Child Sexual Abuse where he expressed his regret at the way in which he had responded when allegations of abuse were made to him by a number of former residents. He also accepted he had put the reputation of the Church ahead of the interests of victims of abuse.

Since retiring, he often assists in the parish of Maroochydore, celebrating Mass on Sunday at various churches in the parish, and celebrating the Sacrament of Confirmation.

Catholic Church titles
| Preceded by Bernard Joseph Wallace | 9th Roman Catholic Bishop of Rockhampton; 1992–2013 | Succeeded by Michael McCarthy |
