= Michael McCarthy (bishop) =

Australian bishop

The Most Reverend Michael McCarthy
- Bishop-emeritus of the Roman Catholic Diocese of Rockhampton
- Diocese: Rockhampton
- Appointed: 10 March 2014
- Installed: 29 May 2014
- Term ended: 1 April 2026
- Predecessor: Brian Heenan
- Successor: Danny Meagher

Orders
- Ordination: 19 August 1978 by Archbishop Francis Roberts Rush
- Consecration: 20 May 2014 by Archbishop Mark Coleridge

Personal details
- Born: Michael Fabian McCarthy; 13 September 1950 (age 76) Toowoomba, Australia
- Denomination: Roman Catholic
- Education: Queensland Institute of Technology, Darling Downs; St Paul's National Seminary; University of Queensland
- Motto: Gloriari In Cruce (Boast in the Cross)
- Coat of arms: Michael McCarthy's coat of arms

Styles of Michael McCarthy
- Reference style: The Most Reverend
- Spoken style: My Lord
- Religious style: Bishop

Michael McCarthy (born 13 September 1950) is the former bishop of the Roman Catholic Diocese of Rockhampton. He was previously a priest of the Roman Catholic Archdiocese of Brisbane. He was consecrated by Archbishop Mark Coleridge at St Joseph's Cathedral, Rockhampton on 29 May 2014.

== Early life ==
Michael McCarthy was born in Toowoomba on 13 September 1950 and was the son of dairy farmers Fabian McCarthy and Rita (née White). He spent his early years on the family's dairy farm in Greenmount. He received his primary education at Greenmount State School and secondary education at Downlands Sacred Heart College in Toowoomba. He graduated from the Queensland Institute of Technology, Darling Downs, in 1970 with a Bachelor of Applied Science and worked as an industrial chemist for BHP in Newcastle from 1971 until 1975.

== Priesthood ==
After leaving BHP, McCarthy entered St Paul's National Seminary, Kensington and graduated with a Diploma in Theology in 1978. He was ordained a deacon at St Michael's Church, Daceyville in 1977 and ordained to the priesthood at St Stephen's Cathedral, Brisbane on 19 August 1978. He achieved a Certificate in Tribunal Practices in 1986 and graduated from University of Queensland in 1998, with a Master of Arts (Studies in Theology).

In 1979, following his ordination, he was appointed to be assistant priest in the parish of Gympie. He then served as assistant priest in the parish of Surfers Paradise between 1983 and 1985. In 1986, he was appointed as Director of the Pontifical Mission Societies and Director of the Catholic Immigration Office for Migrants and Refugees, where he served until 1990.

In 1990, he was appointed parish priest of Laidley, serving there until 1992 when he was appointed parish priest of Surfers Paradise. He became administrator of St Paschal's Parish between 1998 and 1999. Between 1995 and 2000, he served as Director of the Formation of Clergy. From 2001 to 2008, he was rector of Holy Spirit Seminary, Banyo. He served as parish priest of Redcliffe between 2009 and 2012. He was appointed parish priest of Hendra in 2013 and also served as episcopal vicar for clergy.

== Episcopacy ==
On 10 March 2014, Pope Francis announced McCarthy would become the 10th Bishop of Rockhampton, following the retirement of Bishop Brian Heenan on 1 October 2013. He was consecrated and installed on 29 Mary 2014 at St Joseph's Cathedral, Rockhampton by Brisbane Archbishop Mark Coleridge, during a Mass concelebrated by eight Queensland bishops and priests from across Queensland. On 1 April 2026, Pope Leo XIV accepted his resignation and appointed Danny Meagher as his successor.

Catholic Church titles
Preceded by Brian Heenan	10th Roman Catholic Bishop of Rockhampton; 2014–2026	Succeeded by Danny Meagher
