= Andrew Gerard Tynan =

Australian Catholic bishop (1907–1960

The Most Reverend Andrew Gerard Tynan
- Bishop of Diocese of Rockhampton
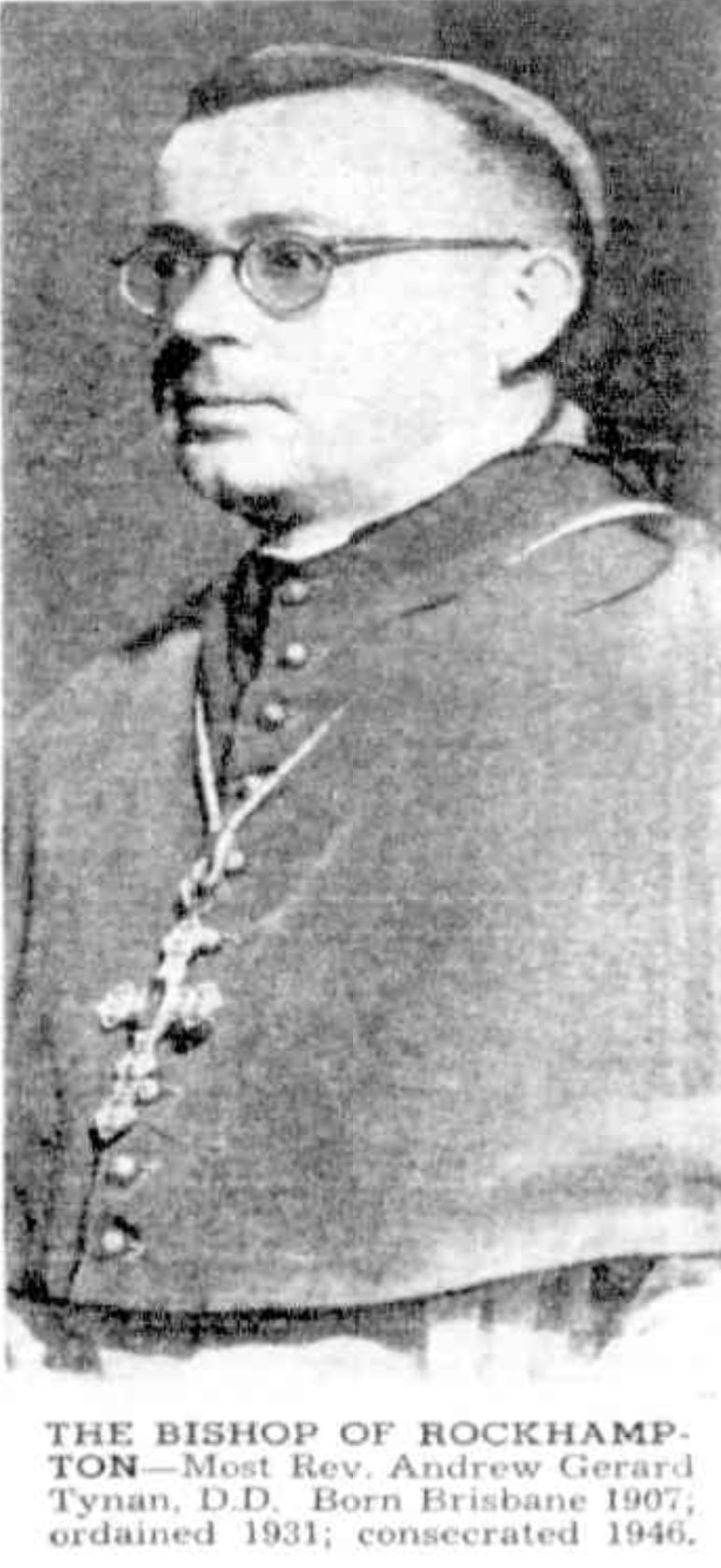
- Andrew Gerard Tynan, Roman Catholic Bishop of Rockhampton, 1953
- Diocese: Rockhampton
- Installed: 20 June 1946
- Term ended: 3 June 1960
- Predecessor: Romuald Denis Hayes
- Successor: Francis Roberts Rush

Orders
- Ordination: 21 March 1931 at Archbasilica of Saint John Lateran by Giuseppe Palica
- Consecration: 19 March 1942 at St Joseph's Cathedral, Rockhampton by Giovanni Panico

Personal details
- Born: Andrew Gerard Tynan; 25 November 1907 Brisbane, Queensland, Australia
- Died: 5 April 1962 (aged 63) London, United Kingdom
- Denomination: Catholic Church
- Occupation: Catholic bishop
- Education: St Columba's College, Sringwood; St Patrick's Seminary, Manly; Pontifical Irish College
- Motto: In Caritate Iustitia ("In Charity and Justice")

Andrew Gerard Tynan (1907–1960) was a Catholic prelate and the Bishop of Rockhampton in Queensland, Australia, from 31 March 1946 until his death on 3 June 1960. He was the first Queenslander to be appointed as a bishop.

== Early life ==
He was born in Brisbane on 25 November 1907, the son of Andrew Tynan and his wife Angela (nee Walsh). He attended St Joseph's College, Gregory Terrace, St Patrick's College, Goulburn and Saint Ignatius' College, Riverview. In 1925, he entered St Columba's College, Springwood to begin studies for the priesthood. He then went on to study at St Patrick's Seminary, Manly before being sent to Rome to continue his studies at the Pontifical Irish College.

== Priesthood ==
On 21 March 1931, Tynan was ordained a priest for the Archdiocese of Brisbane at the Archbasilica of Saint John Lateran by Archbishop Giuseppe Palica. He was ordained alongside six other priest for Australian dioceses. He returned to Brisbane at the end of 1931.

His first appointment was as an assistant priest at Ipswich. Five years later, he transferred to Hendra before joining Cathedral of St Stephen, Brisbane in 1937. In 1938, he became Director for the Propagation of the Faith and first diocesan chaplain of the Young Christian Workers movement.

== Episcopacy ==
On 14 March 1946, Tynan was appointed the sixth Bishop of Rockhampton by Pope Pius XII, becoming the first native of Queensland to become a bishop. He succeeded Bishop Romuald Denis Hayes, who died suddenly in 1945. Tynan was consecrated on 20 June 1946 at Cathedral of St Stephen, Brisbane by Archbishop Giovanni Panico, becoming the youngest member of the Australian Catholic hierarchy. He then travelled north to Rockhampton and took possession of St Joseph's Cathedral, Rockhampton on 30 June 1946.

As bishop, he was known to be firmly committed to the social teachings of the church, a promoter and defender of Catholic Action and a staunch supporter of the church’s role in society. He oversaw steady growth in the Diocese, with new parishes established and the number of priests and religious increasing.

== Death ==
Tynan died suddenly in London on 3 June 1960 while he was travelling to Rome for an ad limina visit. His body was returned to Rockhampton and he was buried on Tuesday 14 June 1960 in the South Rockhampton Cemetery in Allenstown.

Catholic Church titles
Preceded by Romuald Denis Hayes	6th Roman Catholic Bishop of Rockhampton; 1946–1960	Succeeded by Francis Roberts Rush
