= Bernard Joseph Wallace =

Australian Roman Catholic bishop

- Bishop of Rockhampton
- Church: Catholic Church
- Diocese: Diocese of Rockhampton
- In office: 24 January 1974 – 8 May 1990
- Predecessor: Francis Roberts Rush
- Successor: Brian Heenan

Orders
- Ordination: 26 July 1942 by Daniel Mannix
- Consecration: 23 April 1974 by Francis Roberts Rush

Personal details
- Born: 21 June 1919
- Died: 8 November 1990 (aged 71)

Bernard Joseph Wallace (21 June 1919 − 8 November 1990) was an Australian Roman Catholic bishop.

== Early life ==
Wallace was born in Caulfield, Victoria on 21 January 1919, one of four sons born to Michael Joseph and Margaret Mary Wallace. His father died when he was just three years old and his mother died when he was just eight years old. He came from a religious family, with his maternal aunty being a sister with the Faithful Companions of Jesus.

He was educated by the Christian Brothers at Christian Brothers College, St Kilda and St Kevin's College, Melbourne. He was a student with the Missionary Society of St. Columban for two years from 1935 to 1936 before discerning he was being called to Diocesan priesthood.

He had been rejected as a student for the Archdiocese of Melbourne but entered St Columba's College, Springwood in 1936 as a student for the Diocese of Rockhampton. He later moved to St Patrick's Seminary, Manly and then to Pius XII Provincial Seminary in Banyo for his final year of study.

His academic talents were recognised early and while still serving as a subdeacon, he was appointed to return to the Pius XII Provincial Seminary following ordination to serve as the junior dean.

== Priesthood ==
Wallace was ordained a priest for the Diocese of Rockhampton on 26 July 1942 at St Patrick's Cathedral, Melbourne by Archbishop Daniel Mannix.

He served as junior dean of the Pius XII Provincial Seminary until 1948, when he was appointed to parochial duties at Bundaberg and Mount Morgan. In 1954, he returned to the Pius XII Provincial Seminary, teaching dogmatic and moral theology. In 1963 and 1964, he spent eighteen months in Rome, studying at the Pontifical Biblical Institute and the Pontifical Gregorian University. In 1968, he became vice-rector of the seminary.

During his time as a seminary teacher, Wallace was often critical of the church hierarchy. He was critical of Monsignor Cornelius Roberts, who had served as the rector of the seminary from 1954. It was said under his leadership, "it was clear that the purpose of the seminary training was diverted from sacred sciences and spiritual formation to horticulture”.

== Episcopate ==
On 24 January 1974, Wallace was appointed Bishop of Rockhampton by Pope Paul VI. He was consecrated on 23 April 1974 at St Joseph's Cathedral, Rockhampton by Archbishop Francis Roberts Rush.

As bishop, his intellect, wisdom and business acumen were noted, alongside his pastoral care of people. He was regarded as a man of the people, particularly the underprivileged. He was known to visit outback properties in the vast diocese, believing they were no less important than the people he saw every day.

In 1978, he invited the Benedictine sisters from Sydney to make a foundation in the Diocese of Rockhampton. The sisters initially lived in a convent belonging to the Sisters of Mercy in Emu Park before moving to a newly built monastery in Lammermoor. The community now resides in Tanby, Queensland.

He was forced into renovations on St Joseph's Cathedral, Rockhampton in 1980, after expert advice determined a temporary rear wall in the cathedral was unsafe and endangered the structure. After fundraising and planning, the Cathedral was cathedral was completed in simple Gothic harmony wit the whole building. Wallace's additions were seen to be the completion of the vision of Bishop John Cani more than 100 years earlier.

A passionate supporter of education, he desired to build a Diocesan college for day and boarding high school students. The Cathedral College, Rockhampton was opened in 1991, a year after Wallace's death. One of the school houses bears his name.

He was also a strong believer in the ecumenical movement. He was chairman of the Ecumenical Committee of the Australian Catholic Bishops Conference (ACBC) and travelled each year for a meeting of the Anglican-Roman Catholic International Commission. He also served as chairman of the inter-faith commission of the ACBC, served on the Committee for Liturgy from 1979 to 1982, and again from 1988 to 1989. He was a member of the Committee for Renewal Movements for 10 years too.

== Illness and death ==
On 4 May 1990, Wallace resigned as Bishop of Rockhampton due to ill-health. He was still four years shy of the mandatory retirement age of 75.

He faced a battle with cancer, which he eventually succumbed to, dying on 8 November 1990 at the age of 71. His funeral was held at St Joseph's Cathedral, Rockhampton and he was buried in the North Rockhampton Cemetery.

On the liturgy booklet Wallace was quoted as saying, "I was drawn to the priesthood through the missions. In fact, my original desire was to be a missionary rather than a priest. As a boy, I rejected the notion of being a Christian Brother – having ‘no taste for teaching’. Similarly I had left aside the diocesan priesthood because I felt no attraction for parish work. Yet in God’s good time I finished up as a diocesan priest and taught in a seminary for 25 years – and liked it. Surely the Almighty must have his own sense of humour."

In 2010, he was named by the Australian Catholic Bishops Conference as one of the pioneers of ecumenism in Australia.

Catholic Church titles
Preceded by Francis Roberts Rush	8th Roman Catholic Bishop of Rockhampton; 1974–1990	Succeeded by Brian Heenan
