= Joseph Shiel =

- Bishop of Rockhampton
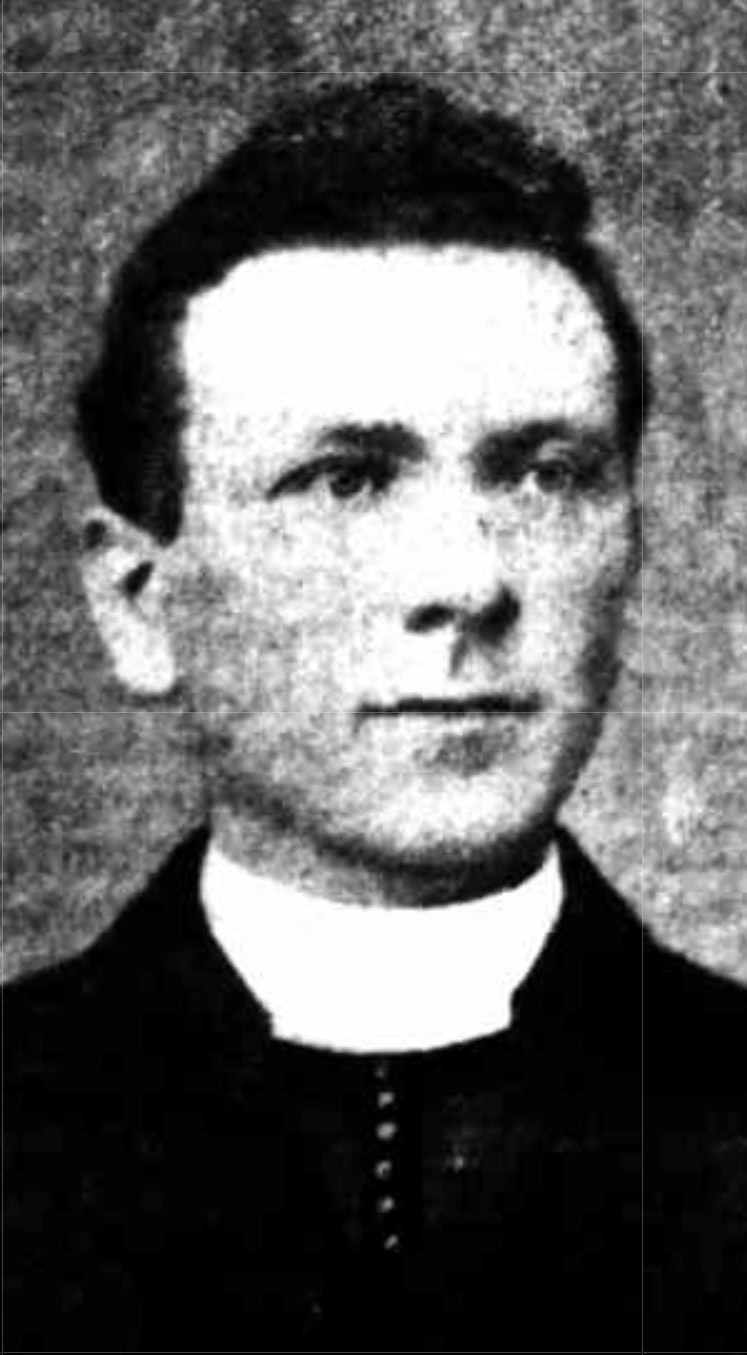
- Joseph Shiel in 1912
- Church: Catholic Church
- Diocese: Diocese of Rockhampton
- In office: 19 August 1912 – 7 April 1931
- Predecessor: James Duhig
- Successor: Romuald Denis Hayes

Orders
- Ordination: 19 June 1898 by William Walsh
- Consecration: 26 January 1913 by Daniel Mannix

Personal details
- Born: 17 February 1873 Swainstown (southeast of Kilmessan), County Meath, United Kingdom of Great Britain and Ireland
- Died: 7 April 1931 (aged 58) Rockhampton, Queensland, Commonwealth of Australia, British Empire

Joseph Shiel (17 February 1873 – 7 April 1931) was a Roman Catholic priest in Australia. He was the Roman Catholic Bishop of Rockhampton from 26 January 1913 until his death on 7 April 1931.

== Early life ==
Joseph Shiel was born on 17 February 1873 at Swainstown, Killmessan, County Meath, Ireland, the son of Richard Shiel and his wife Ann (née Smyth). He was educated at the local National School.

== Religious life ==
Shiel found his vocation for religious life at a young age and entered the seminary of his diocese, St. Finian's College, at Navan. Following his success in a competitive examination, he entered the Maynooth College in September 1892.

Shiel was ordained as a priest on 19 June 1898 by the Archbishop of Dublin. At the time of his ordination, Thomas Carr, Archbishop of Melbourne was visiting Ireland and was seeking priests to come to Australia. Shiel expressed a desire to go to Australia and the Bishop of Meath consented to a five year term.

Shiel arrived in Melbourne on 11 October 1898. Initially he worked at St Patricks in Melbourne. In January 1899 he was appointed assistant to the Venerable Archdeacon Slattery at St Mary's in Geelong. In March 1901 he was transferred as assistant at St Mary's in Collingwood. In March 1903 he was transferred to St Peter's and St Paul's in South Melbourne. When his five year term had expired, Shiel wished to remain in Australia. Joseph Higgins, the Bishop of Rockhampton, was visiting Ireland in 1903 and, being a native of Meath, Higgins visited that diocese where he asked the Bishop of Meath to consent to Shiel remaining in Australia because of the great need for priests in Australia. The Bishop of Meath agreed for Shiel to remain, suggesting that he might assist Higgins in Rockhampton.

Higgins returned to Australia and invited Shiel to join him in Rockhampton. Archbishop Carr of Melbourne agreed to the arrangement and Shiel became the administrator at Mount Morgan, west of Rockhampton. In February 1905 Shiel was appointed administrator of Rockhampton.

In December 1905 Higgins was appointed Bishop of Ballarat and James Duhig was installed as the new Bishop of Rockhampton with Shiel acting as master of ceremonies. Higgins requested for Shiel to join him in Ballarat and Shiel arrived in Ballarat in March 1906 whereupon he was assigned to Hamilton in Western Victoria. In 1908 Shiel was appointed administrator of St Patrick's Cathedral in Ballarat.

In April 1912, Shiel left Australia for a year's holiday. He travelled to Japan and China, where he visited his sister who was a member of a religious order in China. He then travelled to Ireland to visit his mother. Shortly after arriving in Ireland, he contracted a life-threatening case of typhoid fever. While convalescing from that illness, in October 1912 he was advised that he was to become the Bishop of Rockhampton, as James Duhig was being transferred to be the Titular Archbishop of Amica and Coadjutor to the Archbishop of Brisbane, Robert Dunne. On 26 January 1913, Shiel was consecrated as Bishop of Rockhampton at Maynooth College by Archbishop Daniel Mannix, the ceremony having been delayed due to Shiel's illness. On Sunday 11 May 1913, Shiel was enthroned at St Joseph's Cathedral in Rockhampton by James Duhig.

== Later life ==
Shield died on 7 April 1931 aged 58 years at the Mater Misericordiae Hospital at Rockhampton, Queensland following a long illness. His funeral was held in St Joseph's Cathedral on 9 April 1931 after which he was buried in the Rockhampton Cemetery. In addition to the large local congregation, the funeral was attended by Archbishop James Duhig, Bishop of Cooktown John Heavey, and many other Catholic priests. The funeral cortege from the cathedral to the cemetery was so long that the first had arrived at the cemetery before the last had left the cathedral.

Catholic Church titles
Preceded by James Duhig	4th Roman Catholic Bishop of Rockhampton; 1913–1931	Succeeded by Romuald Denis Hayes
