= Joseph Oudeman =

Australian auxiliary bishop emeritus

The Most Reverend Joseph Oudeman O.F.M. Cap.
- Auxiliary Bishop Emeritus of the Roman Catholic Archdiocese of Brisbane
- Diocese: Brisbane
- Appointed: 30 November 2002
- Installed: 11 February 2003
- Term ended: 28 March 2017

Orders
- Ordination: 7 December 1962 by Archbishop Patrick Lyons
- Consecration: 11 February 2003 by Archbishop John Bathersby

Personal details
- Born: Joseph John Oudeman; 2 March 1942 (age 84) Breda, Netherlands
- Denomination: Roman Catholic
- Education: St Patrick's College, Ballarat; Pontifical Gregorian University; University of Queensland
- Motto: Pax Et Bonum (Peace and Good)

Styles of Joseph Oudeman
- Reference style: The Most Reverend
- Spoken style: My Lord
- Religious style: Bishop

Joseph Oudeman (born 2 March 1942) is the auxiliary bishop emeritus of the Roman Catholic Archdiocese of Brisbane and a member of the Order of Friars Minor Capuchin. He was consecrated by Archbishop John Bathersby at Cathedral of St Stephen, Brisbane on 11 February 2003.

== Early life ==
Oudeman was born in 1942 in Breda, Netherlands. He was the eldest of five siblings born to Johanna and Johannes Oudeman. His family emigrated to Australia in 1956 and completed his final years of schooling at St Patrick's College, Ballarat. He entered the Order of Friars Minor Capuchin seminary, outside Sydney, in 1957. He became a professed member of the order in 1962.

== Priesthood ==
Oudeman was ordained to the priesthood on 29 June 1966 by Bishop Patrick Lyons. He studied further and obtained a licentiate in sacred theology at the Pontifical Gregorian University.

He returned to Australia in 1969 and was postulant master at the Catholic Theological Union in Hunters Hill. He became master of novices in Brisbane and spiritual director of the Holy Spirit Seminary, Brisbane in 1977. In 1981, he became assistant parish priest of Balcatta, Western Australia. He was then appointed prefect of the Fratti Seminary of the Capuchins in Plumpton in 1982 and became master of novices in Brisbane in 1985.

In 1987, he became Provincial Minister of the Order, serving in that role until 1996, when he took a sabbatical. In 1999, he was appointed assistant parish priest of Wynnum and chaplain of the Dutch community for the Archdiocese of Brisbane.

== Episcopacy ==
On 11 November 2002, Pope John Paul II appointed Oudeman as auxiliary bishop of the Archdiocese of Brisbane, assigning him the titular see of Respecta. He was consecrated as a bishop on 11 February 2003 by Archbishop John Bathersby.

On 28 March 2017, Pope Francis accepted the resignation of Oudeman and appointed Ken Howell to replace him. After his retirement, he returned to his Capuchin community in Dutton Park and continued to preside at confirmations throughout the archdiocese.

Catholic Church titles
Preceded by Henricus de Wit	— TITULAR — Titular Bishop of Respecta; 2002–present	Incumbent
Preceded by	Auxiliary Bishop of Brisbane; 2002–2017	Succeeded by Kenneth Howell
