= Holy Name Cathedral, Brisbane =

Planned but never-built Roman Catholic cathedral in Queensland, Australia

Holy Name Cathedral
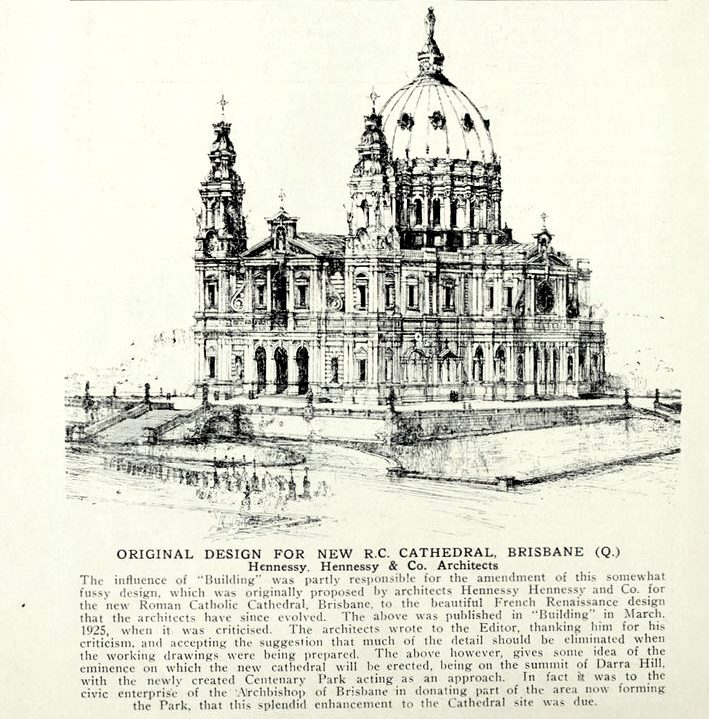
- Holy Name Cathedral, original design of 1925
- Interactive map of the Holy Name Cathedral area

General information
- Type: Cathedral (never completed)
- Architectural style: English Baroque
- Location: Gotha and Gipps, Ann and Wickham Streets, Fortitude Valley, Queensland, Australia
- Coordinates: 27°27′35″S 153°01′58″E
- Construction started: 14 September 1928
- Construction stopped: c. 1930s
- Owner: Roman Catholic Archdiocese of Brisbane

Design and construction
- Architect: Jack Hennessy
- Architecture firm: Hennessy, Hennessy & Co
- Main contractor: Concrete Constructions

The Holy Name Cathedral was a planned but never-built Roman Catholic cathedral for the city of Brisbane, Queensland, Australia. Designed by Hennessy, Hennessy & Co, initially in an English Baroque style inspired by St Paul's in London, it was intended to have been the largest church building of any Christian denomination in the Southern Hemisphere. James Duhig, the Archbishop of Brisbane, was the chief proponent of the project.

First designed in 1925, building began in 1927 and in the 1930s services were held in the crypt chapel on the site, the only part to be built. No further construction took place, and with Duhig's death in 1965 the project lost its impetus, but was not formally abandoned until the 1970s. The Archdiocese sold the site to property developers in 1985, the crypt was demolished and an apartment complex was built on the site. The perimeter wall along Ann Street and part of Gotha Street are all that remain, and were listed on the Queensland Heritage Register in 1992.

== Duhig, the builder ==
In the early years of Duhig's ecclesiastical provinciate, his archdiocese took on an extensive building program, including churches, hospitals and schools, creating his nickname "Duhig the Builder". Projects included the Convent of the Sacred Heart, St Vincent's Hospital, Church of Saint Ignatius Loyola in Toowong 1920s, and the Corpus Christi Church in Nundah in 1926. Within Brisbane, he commissioned the Villa Maria Convent in Fortitude Valley, built in 1927–28. With plans to build a new, larger Cathedral, he completed the existing 19th century Cathedral of St Stephen, Brisbane, with an apse and sanctuary in a simpler design than originally intended in 1922.

== Site ==
The site chosen for the cathedral was in part that of the Bishop's residence, located on a rise just outside the central city, at the southwestern end of the inner suburb of Fortitude Valley, bounded by Gotha and Gipps, Ann and Wickham Streets.

A house called "Dara" had been built on that site in 1850, and in 1859 it became the residence of the first Catholic Bishop of Brisbane, James Quinn (1859–1881). In 1890 the house was replaced by a more substantial dwelling of the same name for the second bishop, Robert Dunne (1830–1917). It was then occupied by his successor Archbishop Duhig from 1917 until he demolished it to make way for his Holy Name Cathedral project.

The rear part of the site on Gipps Street, where the crypt of the Cathedral was eventually built, was owned by Simon Kreutzer (1865–1926), who sold it for a nominal rate to the Brisbane Town Council as a possible site for a new town hall. However, Charles Moffatt Jenkinson, the mayor of Brisbane in 1914, decided to construct the Brisbane City Hall at Albert Square (now known as King George Square), and he committed the council to that decision by selling the Fortitude Valley site to the Catholic Archdiocese for the construction of the cathedral.

== Design ==
The Holy Name Cathedral was designed by the Sydney-based firm of architects Hennessy, Hennessy & Co.

It was intended to be "the largest sacred building in the Commonwealth", being 100 metres (330 ft) long, 67 metres (220 ft) wide and 82 metres (270 ft) high. It was to be capable of seating 4,000 people. This would have in fact been slightly smaller than Saint Joseph's Oratory in Montreal, Canada, which is 105 by 65 metres (344 by 213 ft), which had just begun construction in 1924. St Joseph's was a modified version of the original design of 1914, which bears strong similarities with the Holy Name Cathedral.

A report, with published plans, in Building magazine of 12 September 1927, shows the perspective sketch at the top of this article, which is stated as the first design from 1925, and was 'somewhat fussier' than the final design shown in the plans of 1927.

The Holy Name Cathedral, Brisbane design as published 1927:

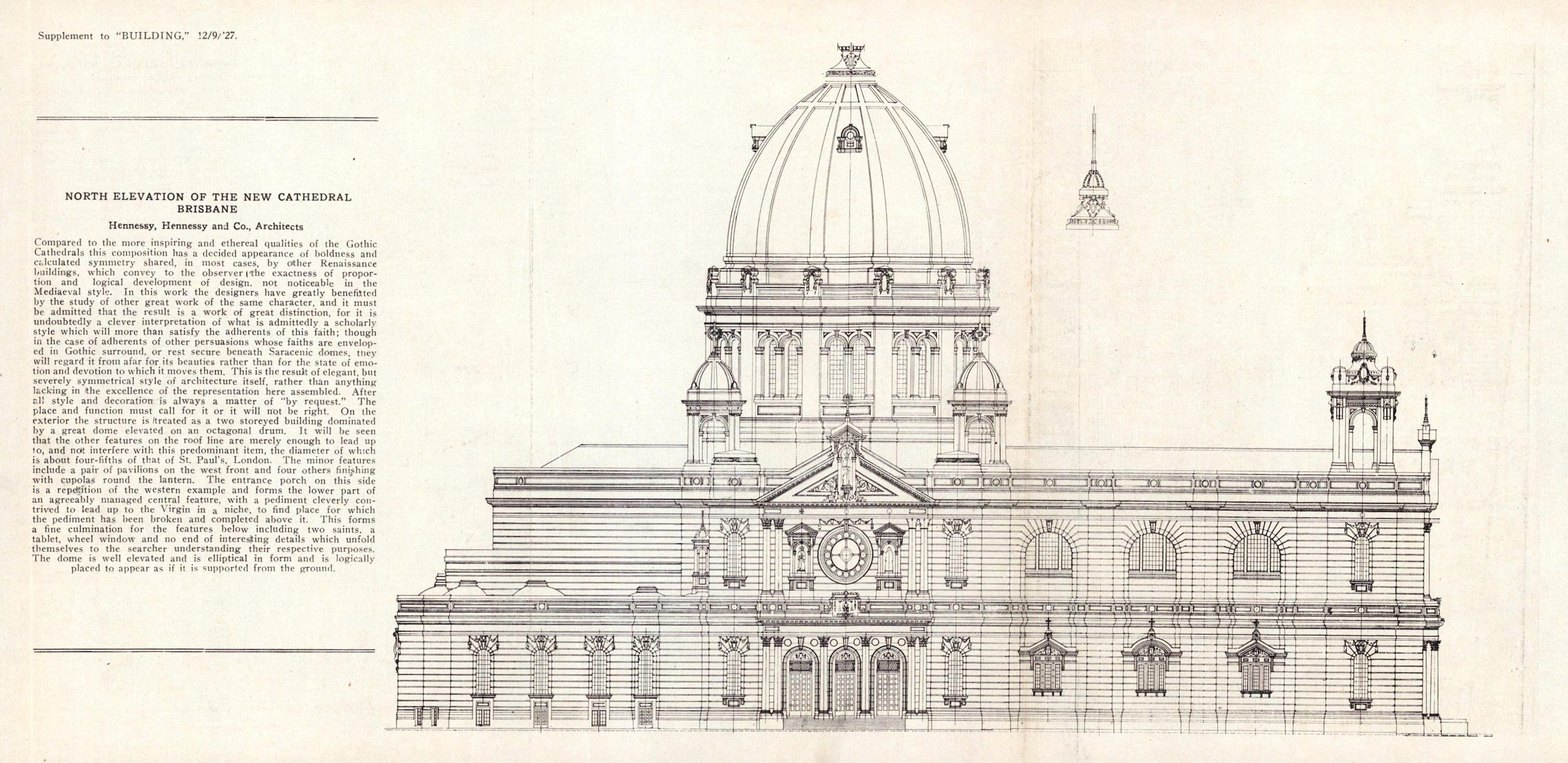
Elevation

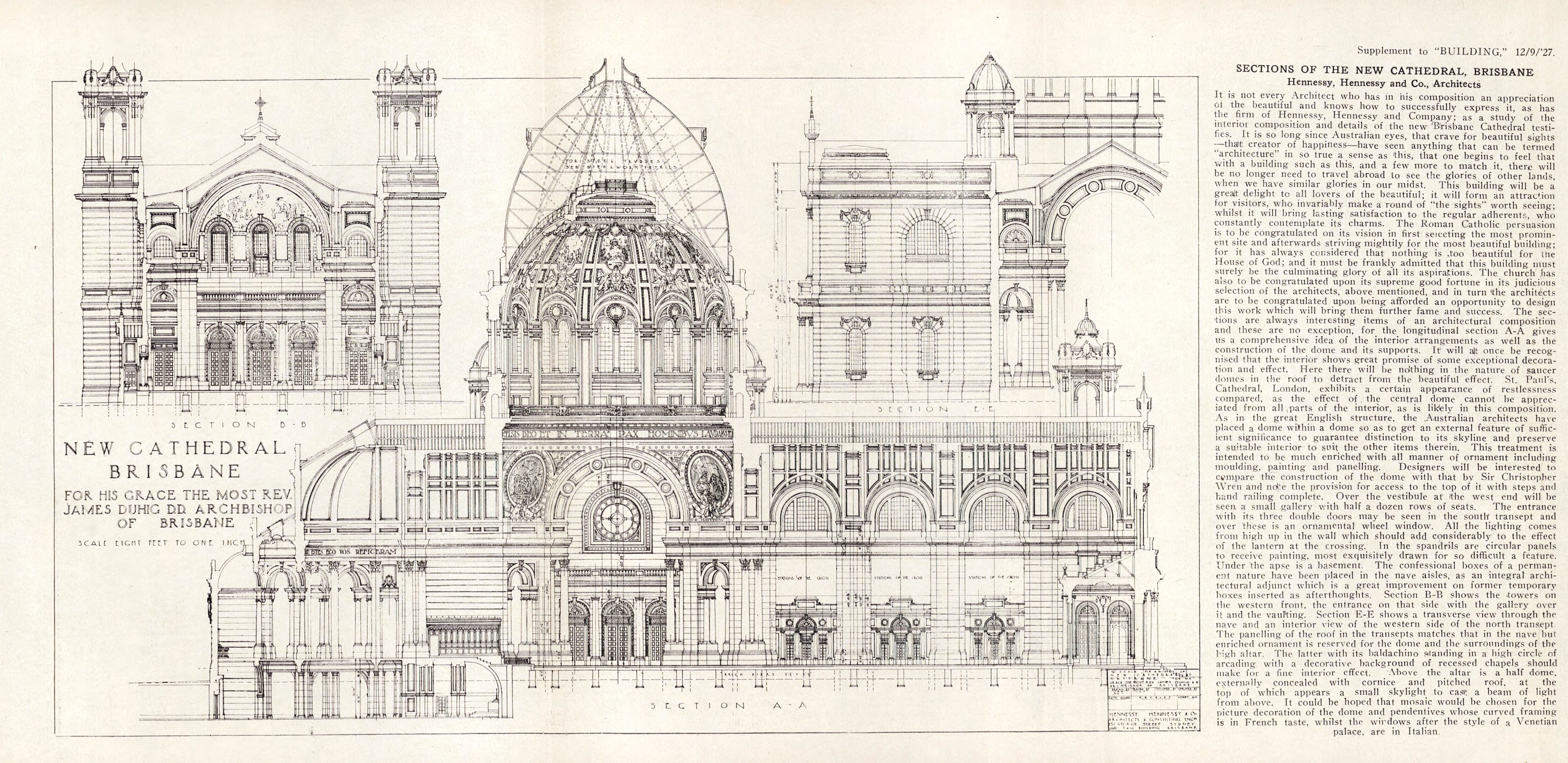
Section

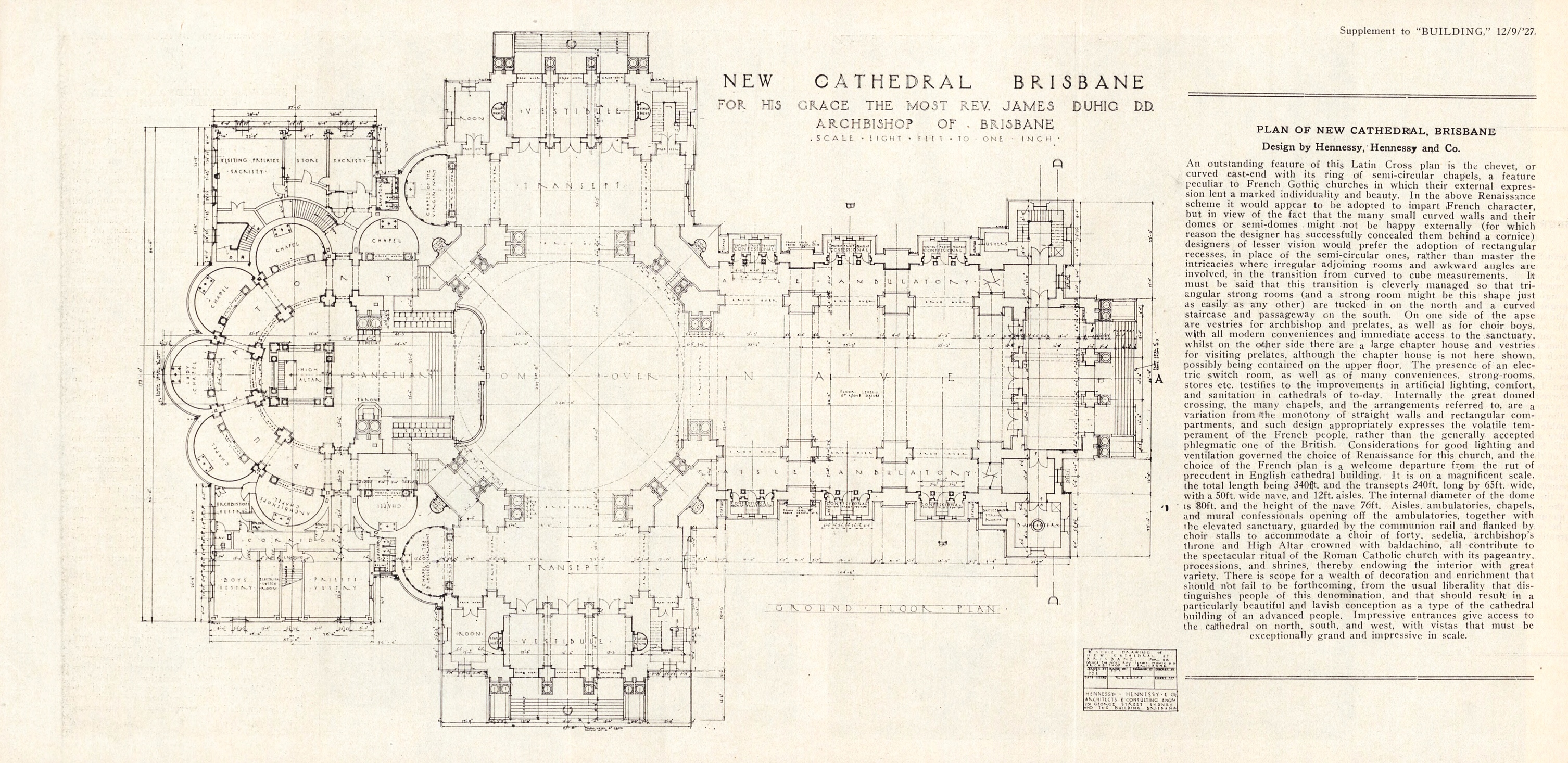
Plan

== Benedict stone ==
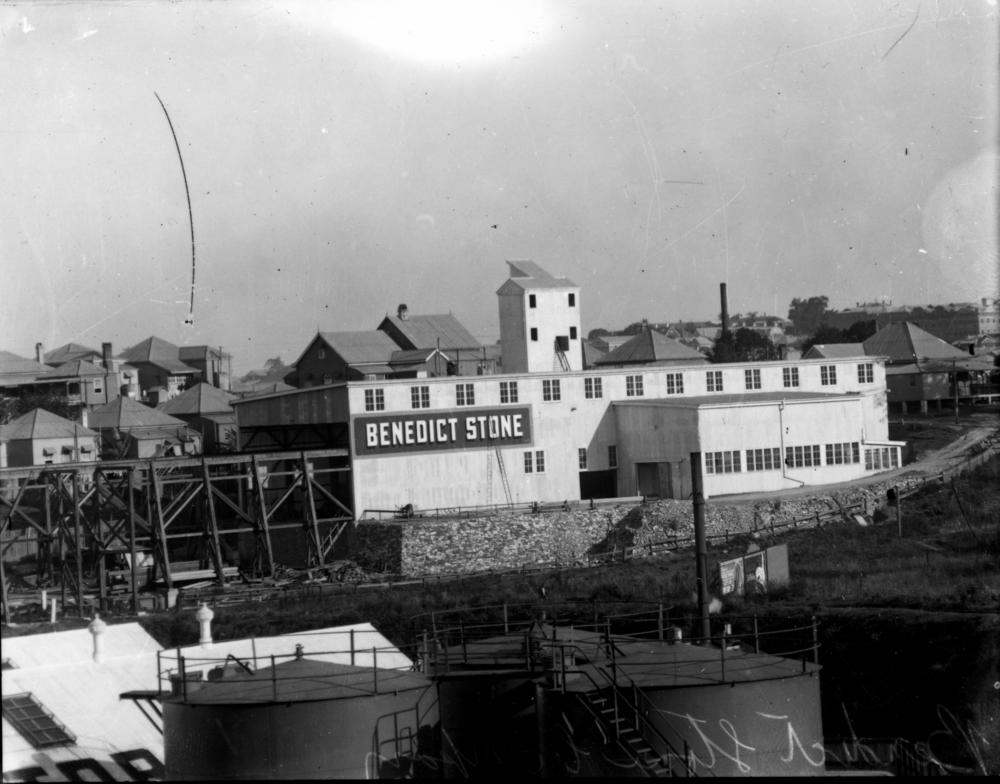
Benedict Stone Factory at Bowen Hills, c. 1934.

Benedict stone, a mixture of cement and crushed Brisbane tuff, was used on building facades as an alternative to full stone construction. It was manufactured by Benedict Stone (Qld) Pty Ltd which was established by Archbishop James Duhig, to manufacture the stone required for the Holy Name Cathedral. The product was developed at the turn of the twentieth century by American manufacturer, Benedict. Duhig obtained a licence from America and opened the Benedict Stone works at Bowen Hills on 9 August 1929. In February 1930 Colonial Mutual Life (CML) advanced Duhig an £70,000 mortgage on his properties which included the stone works. A mutually-dependent relationship developed between CML, Duhig and Jack Hennessy, architect. CML used Benedict stone to build a number of their Australian offices, ensuring some of their mortgage was repaid, and employed Hennessy and Concrete Constructions (Qld) Ltd, who were Duhig's architect and contractor for the Holy Name Cathedral.

== Construction commences ==
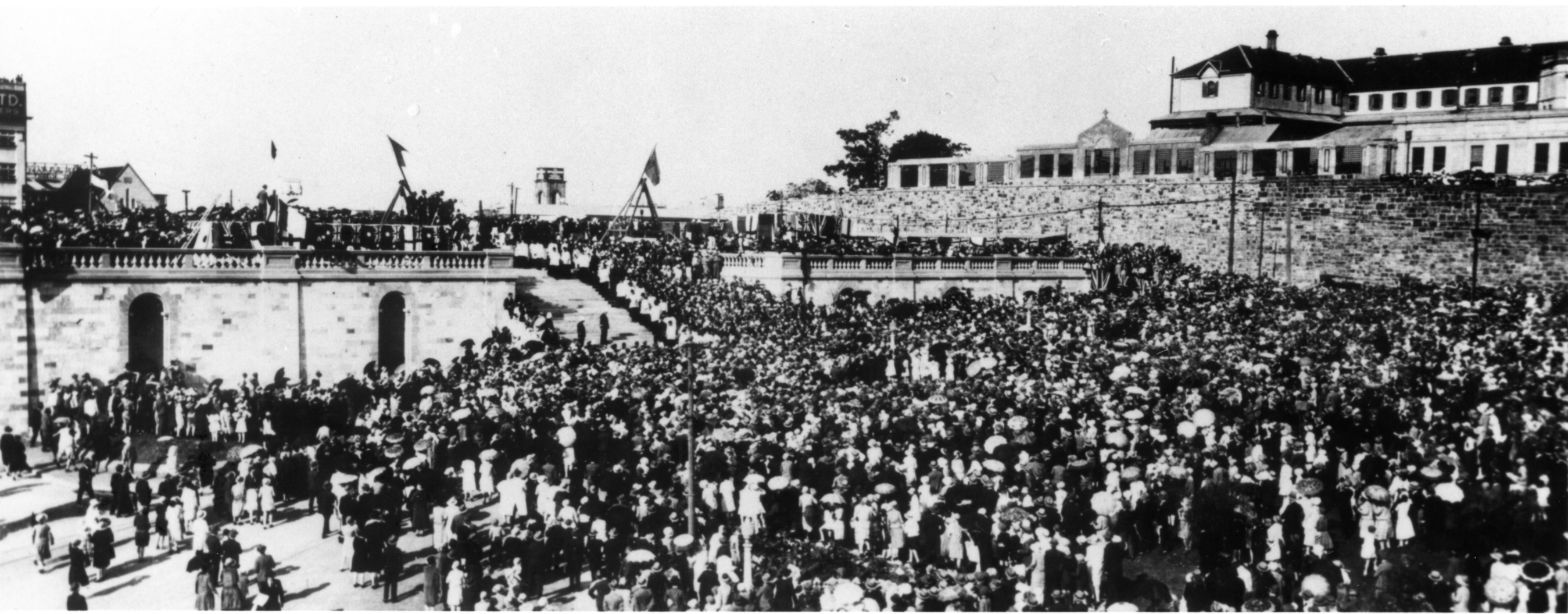
Laying the foundation stone for the Holy Name Cathedral, Ann Street, opposite All Hallows School, 1928

Concrete foundations for the building were laid in 1927, and the foundation stone was laid on 14 September 1928 by the papal legate, Cardinal Cerretti, with a crowd of 35,000 people in attendance. Due to the Great Depression which began in late 1929, fund-raising efforts in the 1930s stalled. Because of lack of funds caused by unwise investment in oil shares of the Roma oil wells the dream did not come to fruition. Nevertheless, Duhig managed to raise enough funds to build a crypt on the site which was completed in 1934. In August 1935, the principal altar in the crypt was consecrated by Duhig. However, fundraising efforts stalled shortly thereafter.

== Construction ceases ==
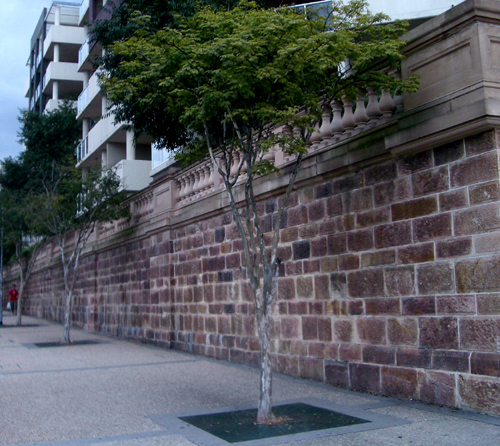
This retaining wall and balustrade along Ann Street is the only remaining part of the projected cathedral.

The Holy Name Cathedral project was subject to further ongoing setbacks. In 1949 the architect, Jack Hennessy, sued for unpaid fees and in 1950 the court awarded him over £25,000.

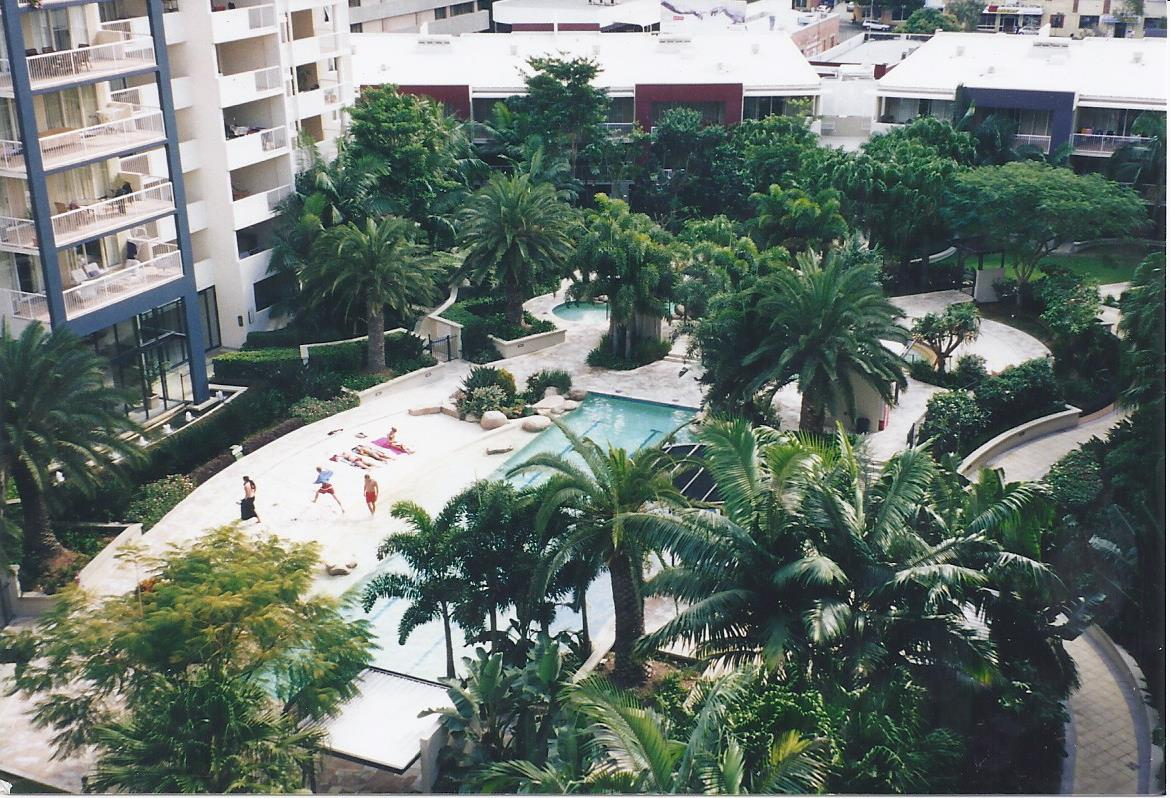
Cathedral Place apartment complex, circa 2005

The cathedral was never completed. In 1985 the Archdiocese sold the site to property developers and an apartment complex called "Cathedral Place" was subsequently built. The perimeter walls of the cathedral which were topped by balustrades on the boundaries along Ann Street and part of Gotha Street have been preserved. The surviving remnants of the cathedral were heritage-listed in 1992. St Stephen's Cathedral in the Brisbane central business district continues to be the seat of the Catholic Archbishop of Brisbane. The foundation stones of the Holy Name Cathedral were removed and placed in St Stephen's Cathedral between the 1921 – 22 and 1988 – 1989 extensions of St Stephen's at the entrance to the Eucharist Chapel.
