= Danny Meagher (bishop) =

Australian Catholic bishop (born 1961)

The Most Reverend Danny Meagher
- Bishop of Rockhampton
- Diocese: Rockhampton
- Appointed: 1 April 2026
- Installed: 28 May 2026
- Predecessor: Michael McCarthy
- Previous posts: Titular Bishop of Pocofelto (2021–2026); Auxiliary Bishop of Sydney (2021–2026)

Orders
- Ordination: 22 August 1995 by Edward Clancy
- Consecration: 8 December 2021 by Anthony Fisher

Personal details
- Born: Daniel Joseph Meagher; 10 November 1961 (age 65) West Wyalong, New South Wales, Australia
- Denomination: Catholic Church
- Education: University of Sydney; Pontifical Gregorian University
- Motto: God Only God
- Coat of arms

Styles of Daniel Meagher
- Reference style: The Most Reverend
- Spoken style: His Lordship or My Lord Bishop
- Religious style: Bishop

Daniel Joseph Meagher (born 10 November 1961) is an Australian Catholic prelate who has served as Bishop of Rockhampton since 2026. He served as an auxiliary bishop of the Roman Catholic Archdiocese of Sydney from 2021 to 2026. Previously parish priest of All Hallows' Parish in Five Dock, his episcopal consecration took place on 8 December 2021.

== Early life ==
Meagher was born in West Wyalong, New South Wales, on 10 November 1961 to Alan and Elizabeth Meagher. He was educated at Saint Ignatius' College, Riverview, and studied economics and law at the University of Sydney.

== Career ==
Meagher was ordained a priest at St Mary's Cathedral, Sydney, on 22 July 1995. He served as the founding parish priest of Holy Spirit Parish in Carnes Hill from 2000 to 2004. He then studied for two years at the Gregorian Pontifical University in Rome, obtaining a Licentiate in Fundamental Theology. From 2012 to 2014, he served as the administrator of Sacred Heart Cathedral in Broken Hill, New South Wales, within the Diocese of Wilcannia–Forbes.

In 2015, Meagher returned to Sydney and was rector of the Seminary of the Good Shepherd until 2020 and, in 2021, he was the administrator of All Hallows in Five Dock.

Meagher was appointed an auxiliary bishop of Sydney by Pope Francis on 18 November 2021 and was given the titular see of Pocofelto in Tunisia. He was consecrated by Archbishop Anthony Fisher on 8 December 2021 at St Mary's Cathedral, Sydney.

On 1 April 2026, Pope Leo XIV appointed Meagher as Bishop of Rockhampton. On 28 May of the same year, he had his first Mass in St Joseph's Cathedral for his installation, with several bishops from different parishes, priests and deacons. Other people in the congregation joined from different denominational churches like the Anglican Bishop of Rockhampton and a Greek-Orthodox Bishop, His Grace Bishop Bartholomew, also attended.

Meagher‘s nephew, Matthew Meagher, is also a priest of the Catholic Archdiocese of Sydney.
