= John Cani =

Italian Roman Catholic bishop

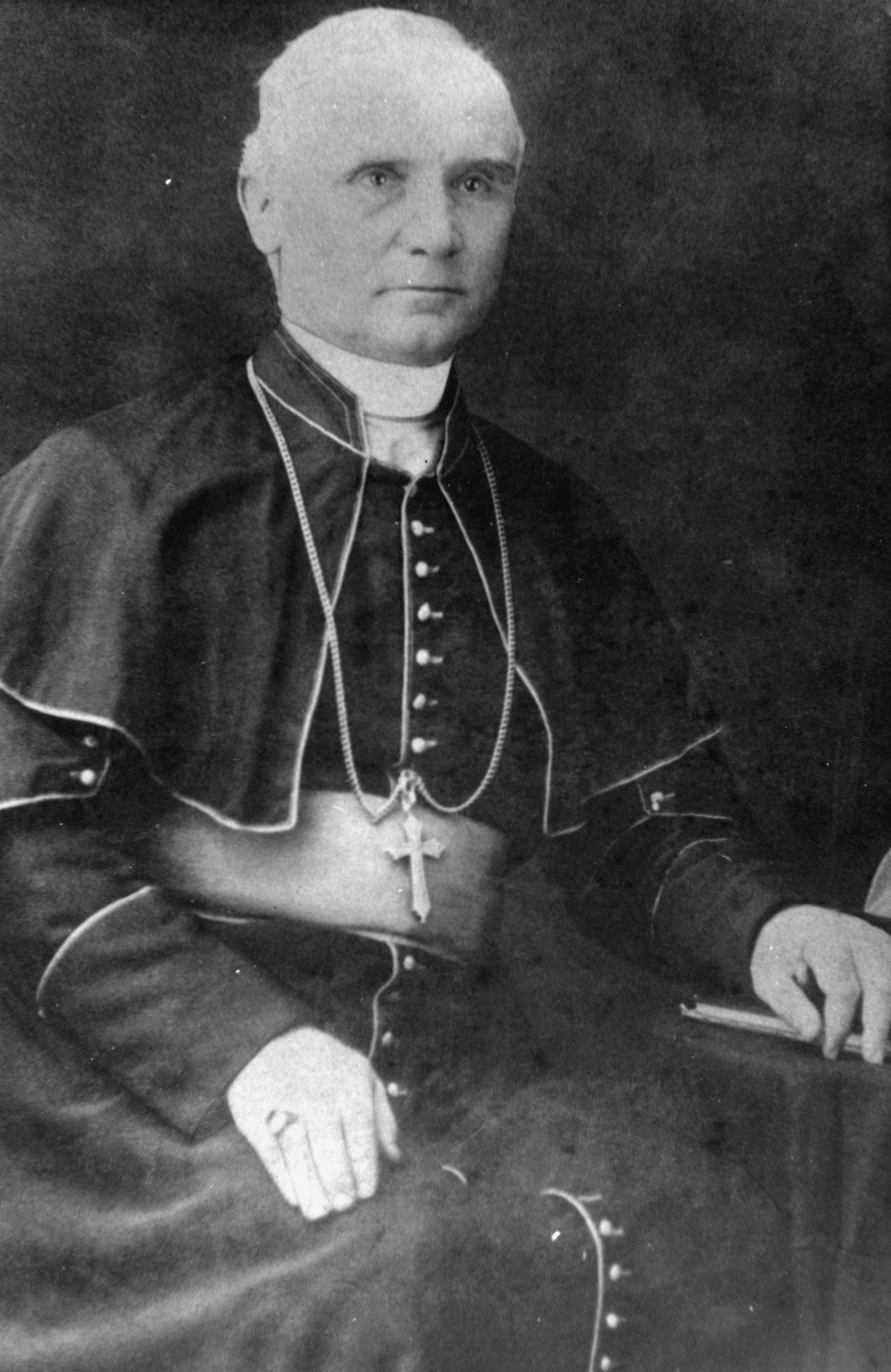
Giovanni John Cani Bishop of Rockhampton from 1882 to 1898

John Cani, also known as Giovanni Cani (22 December 1836 – 3 March 1898) was a Roman Catholic Bishop of Rockhampton.

== Early life ==
Cani was born at Castel Bolognese, Province of Ravenna, Italy, and educated in his native province and at the Sapienza University of Rome, where he graduated D.D. and LL.D.

== Religious life ==
He was ordained a priest in 1859, and accompanied the first Roman Catholic Bishop of Brisbane, Dr. James Quinn, to Queensland. He was appointed parish priest at Warwick, Queensland in the same year, and went to Brisbane in 1868.

Ten years later Dr. Cani was made Pro-Vicar Apostolic of Northern Queensland. On the death of Bishop Quinn, the diocese of Brisbane was divided into two and Dr. Cani was appointed, by papal brief, Bishop of Rockhampton, and was consecrated in St. Mary's Cathedral, Sydney, by Archbishop Roger Vaughan, on 21 May 1882.

He commenced construction of St Joseph's Cathedral in Rockhampton in 1893 but did not live to see it completed.

== Later life ==
Cani contracted dengue fever in November 1897. While he recovered from the fever, he remained in poor health and died from heart failure at his residence in Rockhampton on Thursday 3 March 1898 aged 62. On Saturday 5 March 1898, a Solemn Requiem Mass was held at St Joseph's Pro-Cathedral after which he was buried in South Rockhampton Cemetery. As it was the custom of the Roman Catholic Church to bury a bishop within his cathedral, the burial in the local cemetery was intended as a temporary measure with the intention to inter him permanently within the cathedral once completed. On 22 July 1902 his remains were exhumed and re-interred in St Joseph's Cathedral in a "brief but impressive" ceremony. His remains were placed in a vault under a memorial window dedicated to him by the Sisters of Mercy.

Catholic Church titles
Preceded by new appointment	1st Roman Catholic Bishop of Rockhampton; 1882–1898	Succeeded by Joseph Higgins
