= James Duhig =

Irish-born Australian Roman Catholic religious leader

The Most Reverend Sir James Duhig KCMG
- 3rd Roman Catholic Archbishop
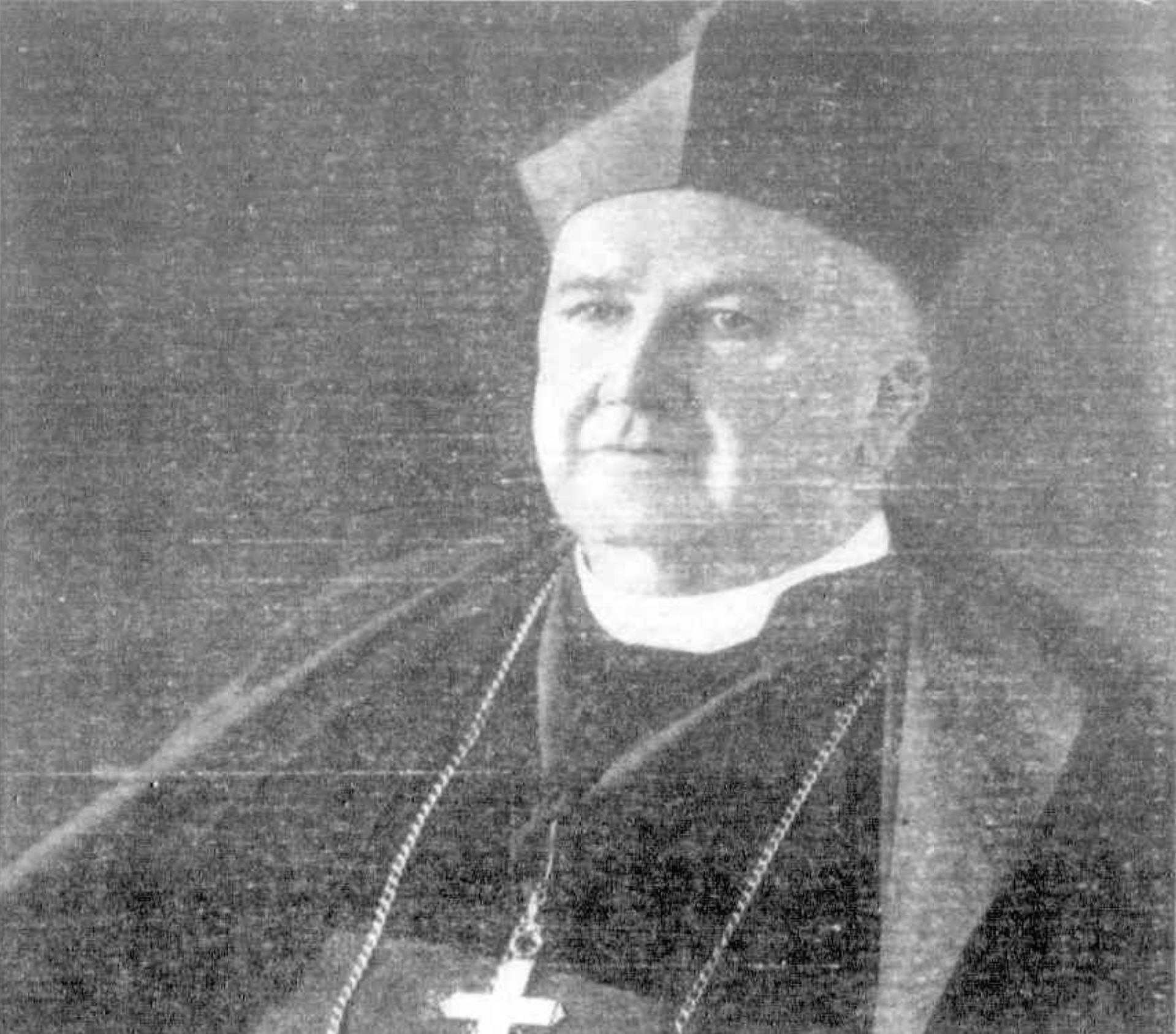
- James Duhig, 1953
- Archdiocese: Brisbane
- Province: Brisbane
- Installed: 13 January 1917
- Term ended: 10 April 1965
- Predecessor: Robert Dunne
- Successor: Patrick O'Donnell
- Other post: Bishop of Rockhampton (1905 – 1912)

Orders
- Ordination: 19 September 1896 (Priest) in Rome by Cardinal Cassetta
- Consecration: 10 December 1905 Bishop by Archbishop Michael Kelly

Personal details
- Born: 2 September 1871 Broadford, County Limerick, Ireland
- Died: 10 April 1965 (aged 93) New Farm, Brisbane, Queensland, Australia
- Buried: St Stephen's Cathedral, Brisbane
- Denomination: Roman Catholic
- Parents: John and Margaret (née Barry) Duhig
- Occupation: Cleric
- Education: St Joseph's, Gregory Terrace; Irish College, Rome; Pontifical Urbaniana University

Sir James Duhig KCMG (2 September 1871 – 10 April 1965) was an Irish-born Australian Roman Catholic religious leader. He was the Archbishop of Brisbane for 48 years from 1917 until his death in 1965. At the time of his death he was the longest-serving bishop in the Catholic Church (1905–1965).

== Early years ==
Duhig was born in Broadford, County Limerick but emigrated with his family to Australia as a young boy. He completed his education at St. Joseph's College, Gregory Terrace, Queensland. After that, he worked for the Cooperative Butchering Company. After undertaking his studies for the priesthood at the Irish College and Pontifical Urbaniana University, both in Rome, Duhig was ordained a priest in 1896 and his profile grew rapidly.

== Episcopacy ==
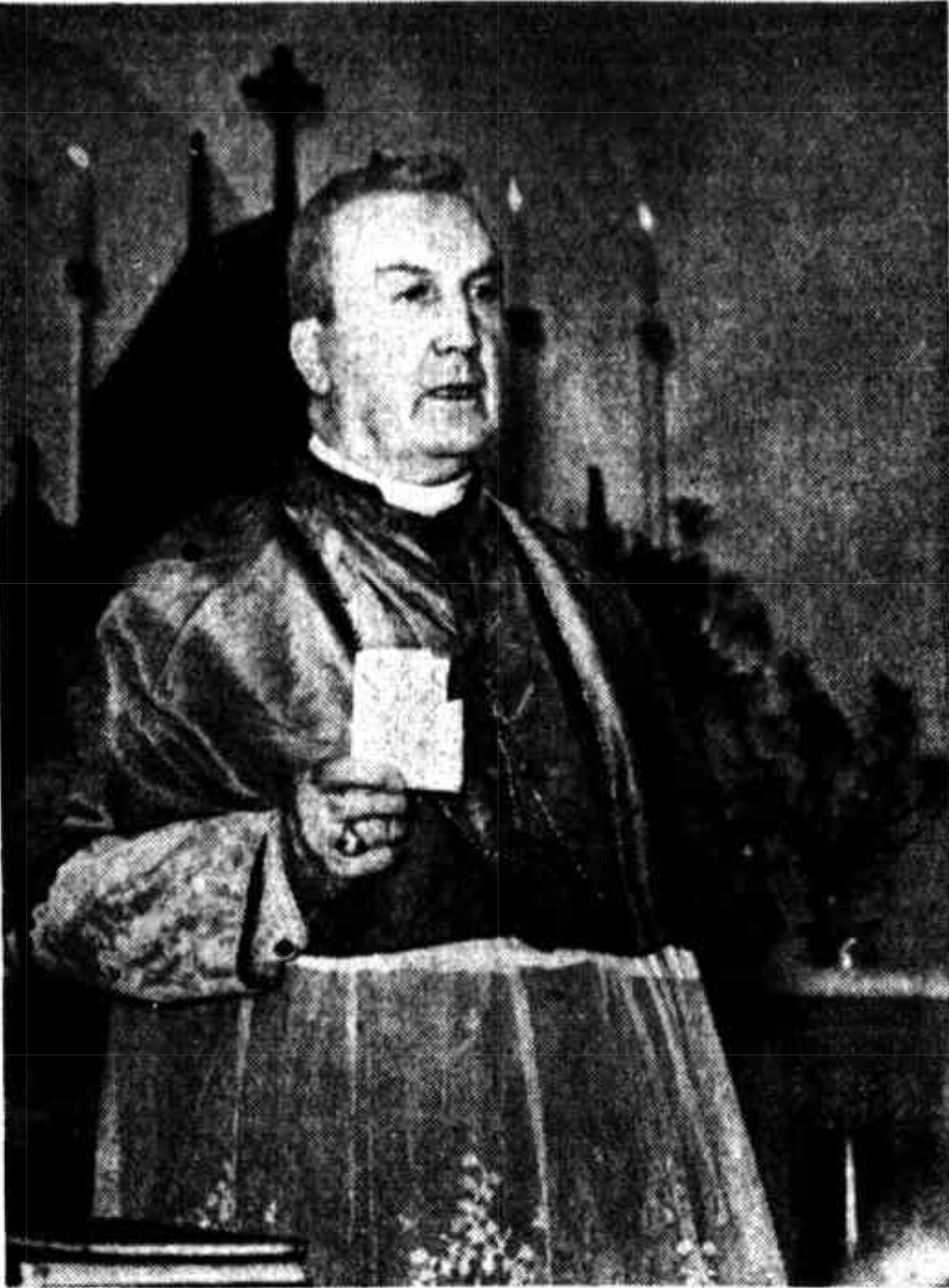
Archbishop Duhig at the opening of St Clement's Melkite Catholic Church, South Brisbane, 1936

On 10 December 1905, he became the youngest bishop in the Catholic Church when he was consecrated Bishop of Rockhampton. (Bishop Duhig penned the article on the Diocese of Rockhampton for the Catholic Encyclopedia.) On 26 February 1912, he was transferred to Brisbane, where he became the coadjutor archbishop to the elderly Archbishop Robert Dunne. On 13 January 1917 he succeeded as Archbishop of Brisbane, a position he held for 48 years until his death in 1965.

In the early years of Duhig's tenure, his archdiocese took on an extensive building program, including churches, hospitals and schools, erecting more than 400 buildings, earning him the nickname of "Duhig the Builder". These buildings are a prominent feature of the Brisbane landscape to this day. His most ambitious project, the Cathedral of the Holy Name in Fortitude Valley, was a casualty of the Great Depression which destroyed the value of the investments that were to finance the project. In addition to the construction of buildings, Duhig created over fifty new parishes and encouraged the establishment of twenty communities of religious men and women in an ecclesiastical province that had previously been dominated by the Irish Christian Brothers and the Sisters of Mercy.

One of his most notable acts as Archbishop was being the recognised founder of St Columban's College, with the school being founded in 1928 by the Archbishop, being located in Albion. On Sunday 29 January 1928, St Columban’s College was officially opened. The property, Highlands, was one of the stately homes of Brisbane. The site was spectacular, looking out over the Brisbane River and the city of Brisbane. Highlands was purchased by Archbishop Duhig in 1926 and passed into the hands of the Christian Brothers, whom he invited to run the College for the purpose of providing a Catholic education for young boys. As founder of St Columban’s College, Archbishop Duhig supported the Christian Brothers in their educational endeavours with large sums of money, especially in the late 1950s when the College had to expand dramatically. Archbishop Duhig always regarded the school as something very dear to him. He was a great diplomat and was proud of his association with the College.

== Public life ==
Duhig played an active role in public life. However, unlike his contemporary, Archbishop Daniel Mannix of Melbourne, who seemed to thrive on public attention, controversy and inflaming public passions, Duhig favoured accommodation with the (largely Protestant) established order. This was reflected not only in his being awarded official honours, but also in the positive ecumenical legacy that he left to the Christian community in Brisbane and throughout the State of Queensland.

In February 1934, Duhig was elected President of the Royal Geographical Society of Queensland.

In 1937 Duhig successfully proposed that the River Road (from Brisbane city to Toowong) should be renamed Coronation Drive, to celebrate the coronation of King George VI.

== Honours ==
Duhig played a major role in the development of the University of Queensland, being a member of the university senate from 1916 until his death in 1965. He established St Leo's College, where an annual lecture is given in his honour. The university recognised Duhig's contribution by naming the Duhig Library after him and awarding him an honorary degree of Doctor of Laws.

Duhig was appointed a Companion of the Order of St Michael and St George (CMG) in 1954 in recognition of service as the Roman Catholic Archbishop of Brisbane, and made a Knight Commander (KCMG) of the order in 1959 in recognition of service as the Roman Catholic Archbishop of Queensland.

== Published works ==
Duhig published the following works:

- Duhig, James (1947), Crowded years, Angus and Robertson

Catholic Church titles
Preceded by Joseph Higgins	3rd Roman Catholic Bishop of Rockhampton; 1905–1912	Succeeded by Joseph Shiel
Preceded by Robert Dunne	3rd Roman Catholic Archbishop of Brisbane; 1917–1965	Succeeded by Patrick O'Donnell
