= Roman Catholic Diocese of Rockhampton =

Latin Catholic ecclesiastical jurisdiction in Australia

Diocese of Rockhampton Dioecesis Rockhamptoniensis
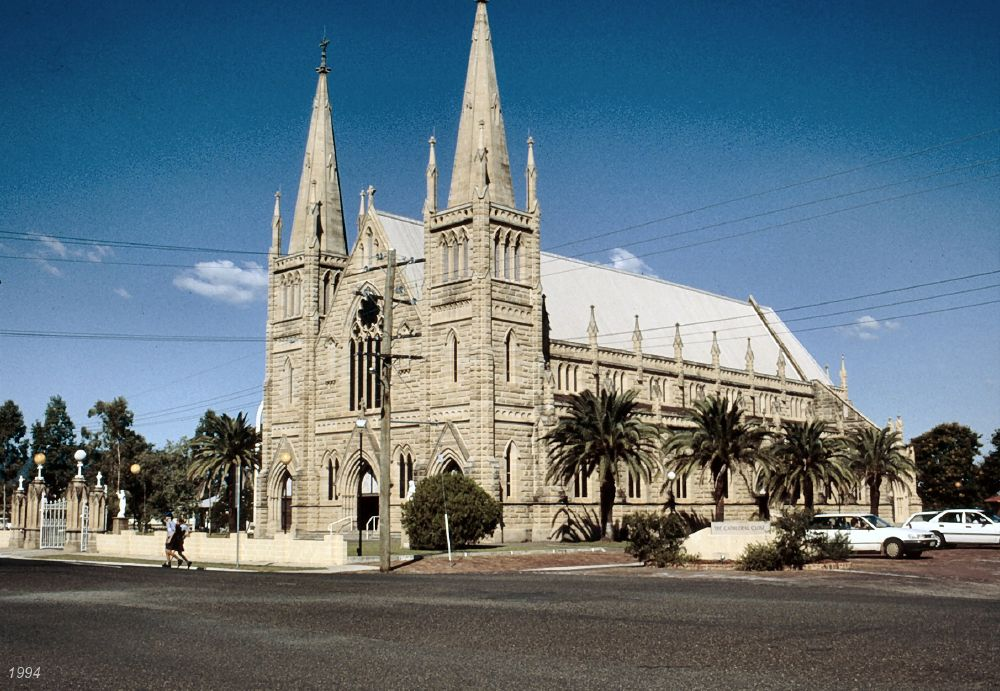
- St Josephs Cathedral, 1994

Location
- Country: Australia
- Territory: Central Queensland
- Ecclesiastical province: Province of Brisbane
- Coordinates: 23°23′07″S 150°30′21″E

Statistics
- Area: 415,000 km^{2} (160,000 sq mi)
- Population: Total; Catholics: (as of 2004); ▲372,000; ▲95,000 (▼25.5%%)
- Parishes: 39

Information
- Denomination: Catholic Church
- Sui iuris church: Latin Church
- Rite: Roman Rite
- Established: 29 December 1882
- Cathedral: St Joseph's Cathedral

Current leadership
- Pope: Leo XIV
- Bishop: Danny Meagher
- Bishops emeritus: Michael McCarthy

Map

Website
- Catholic Diocese of Rockhampton

The Diocese of Rockhampton is a Latin Church ecclesiastical territory or diocese of the Catholic Church in Australia. It is a suffragan in the ecclesiastical province of the metropolitan Archdiocese of Brisbane. Erected in 1882, it covers Central Queensland.

== History ==
The Diocese of Rockhampton was excised from the Archdiocese of Brisbane on 29 December 1882. Prior to this, the Brisbane archdiocese had responsibility for the entire state of Queensland, but the creation of the Rockhampton diocese split the state with responsibilities for the southern part of Queensland to remain with the Brisbane archdiocese while the northern part of Queensland became the responsibility of the new Rockhampton diocese. The Diocese of Townsville was excised from the Diocese of Rockhampton in 1930, reducing Rockhampton's coverage to Central Queensland, while Townsville took responsibility for the areas further to the north.

== Bishops ==
=== Ordinaries ===
The following individuals have been elected as Roman Catholic Bishops of Rockhampton:

Order	Name	Date enthroned	Reign ended	Term of office	Reason for term end
1	John Cani †	3 January 1882	3 March 1898	16 years, 59 days	Died in office
2	Joseph Higgins †	21 September 1899	3 March 1905	5 years, 163 days	Appointed Bishop of Ballarat
3	James Duhig †	16 September 1905	27 February 1912	6 years, 164 days	Elevated as Coadjutor Archbishop of Brisbane
4	Joseph Shiel †	11 May 1913	7 April 1931	18 years, 231 days	Died in office
5	Romuald Denis Hayes, SSC †	12 January 1932	25 October 1945	13 years, 286 days	Died in office
6	Andrew Gerard Tynan †	31 March 1946	3 June 1960	14 years, 64 days	Died in office
7	Francis Roberts Rush †	7 November 1960	5 March 1973	12 years, 118 days	Elevated as Archbishop of Brisbane
8	Bernard Joseph Wallace †	24 January 1974	8 May 1990	16 years, 104 days	Resigned and appointed Bishop Emeritus of Rockhampton
9	Brian Heenan	20 November 1992	1 October 2013	33 years, 191 days	Retired and appointment Bishop Emeritus of Rockhampton
10	Michael McCarthy	29 May 2014	1 April 2026	11 years, 307 days	Retired and appointed Bishop Emeritus of Rockhampton
11	Danny Meagher	28 May 2026	present	0 days	Appointed Bishop of Rockhampton

=== Other priests of this diocese who became bishops ===
- Guilford Clyde Young †, appointed Auxiliary Bishop of Canberra (and Goulburn) in 1948
- Raymond Conway Benjamin †, appointed Bishop of Townsville in 1984

== Parishes ==
The diocese is divided into four separate deaneries that administer individual parishes:

- Central deanery covering Rockhampton and the Capricorn Coast with regular liturgical services held in the Cathedral of St Joseph, Emu Park (Mary Immaculate), Gracemere (St Paul), Mount Morgan (Sacred Heart), Berserker (St Mary), Norman Gardens (Holy Family), Park Avenue (Our Lady Help of Christians), Westwood (Sacred Heart), Wowan (St Anne), and Yeppoon (Sacred Heart)
- Southern deanery covering Bundaberg, Gladstone and the Valleys Region with regular liturgical services held in Agnes Water (St Agnes), Baffle Creek (St Francis of Assis), Baralaba (St Patrick), Bargara (St James), Biloela (St Joseph), Bundaberg (Holy Rosary), Calliope (St Patrick), Gladstone (Our Lady, Star of the Sea), Miriam Vale (St Peter Chanel), Mount Larcom (Our Lady of Mt Carmel), Monto (St Therese), Moura (St Michael), Walkervale (St Mary), Tannum Sands (St Peter Chanel), Theodore (Sacred Heart), Ubobo (St Mary), Bundaberg West (St Patrick)
- Northern deanery with regular liturgical services held in Alligator Creek (St Therese), Bucasia (St Brendan), Calen (St Helen), Eton (Holy Cross), Farleigh (St Brigid), Finch Hatton (St Francis de Sales), Mackay (St Patrick), Marian (Holy Rosary), Midge Point (St Peter), Mirani (Immaculate Conception), North Mackay (St Joseph), Sarina (St Michael), Seaforth (Star of the Sea), South Mackay (St Mary), Walkerston (St John the Apostle), and West Mackay (St Francis Xavier)
- Western deanery covering two regions with regular liturgical services held in:
  - Central Highlands region – Blackwater (Mary Immaculate), Capella (St Joseph), Clermont (St Mary), Dingo (St Joseph), Duaringa (St Kevin), Dysart (St Therese of Lisieux), Emerald (St Patrick), Middlemount (Holy Family), Moranbah (St Joseph the Worker), Springsure (Our Lady of the Sacred Heart), Tieri (St Thomas More), and Woorabinda (St Martin de Porres)
  - Central West region – Alpha (St John the Evangelist), Aramac (St John), Barcaldine (Sacred Heart), Blackall (St Patrick), Ilfracombe (Sacred Heart), Isisford (St Joseph), Jericho (St Finnian), Jundah (St Peter), Longreach (St Brigid) and Tambo (Our Lady of Victories)

== Education ==
The diocese operates many Catholic schools via its Rockhampton Catholic Education Office.

== See also ==
- Catholic Church in Australia
