= Patrick Mary O'Donnell =

Irish-born Roman Catholic priest

- Archbishop of Brisbane
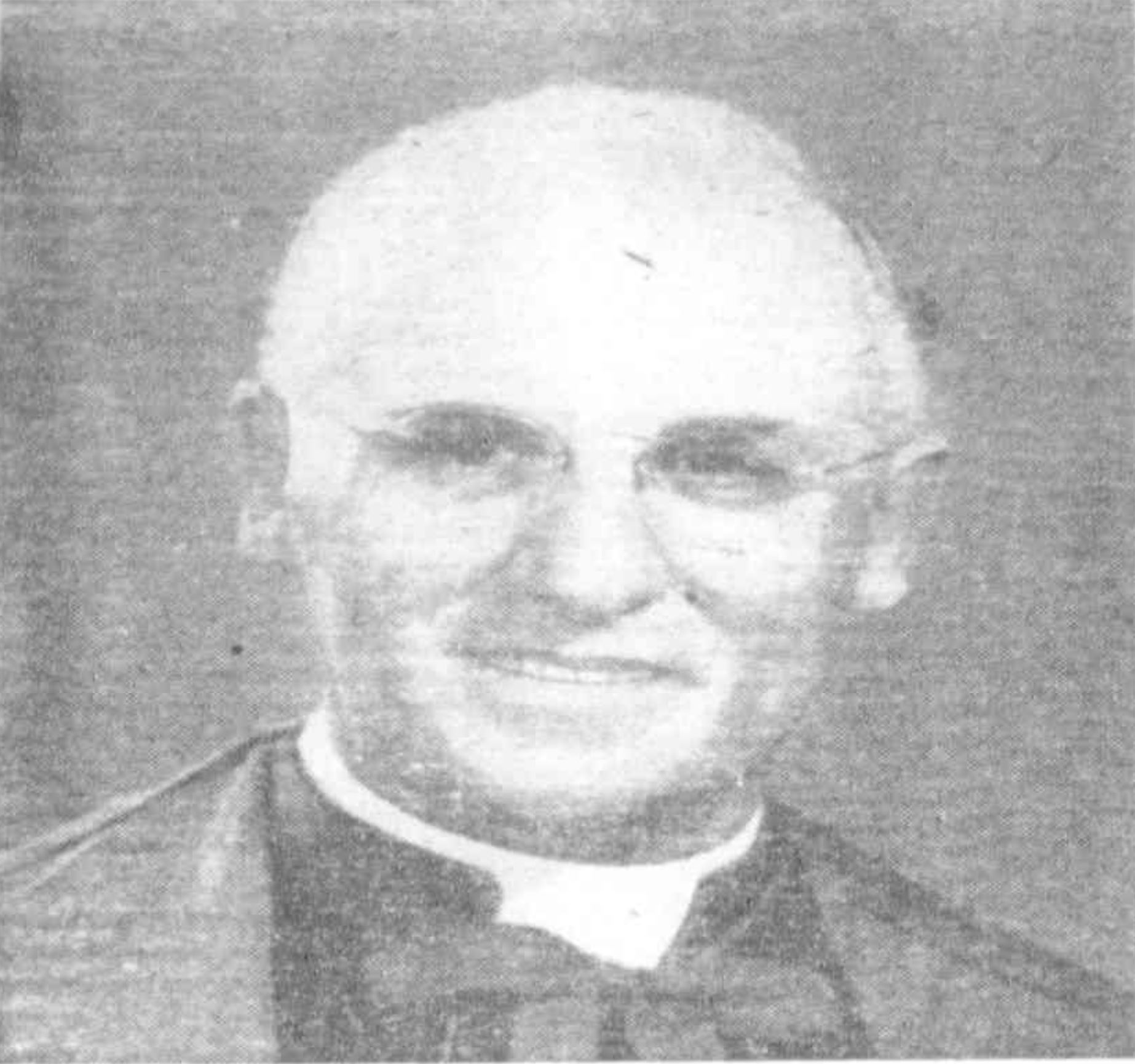
- Patrick Mary O'Donnell in 1953
- Church: Catholic Church
- Archdiocese: Archdiocese of Brisbane
- In office: 10 April 1965 – 5 March 1973
- Predecessor: James Duhig
- Successor: Francis Roberts Rush
- Previous posts: Titular Archbishop of Pelusium (1948-1965); Coadjutor Archbishop of Brisbane (1948-1965)

Orders
- Ordination: 15 April 1922 by Basilio Pompili
- Consecration: 17 March 1949 by Norman Gilroy

Personal details
- Born: 2 February 1897 Fethard, County Tipperary, United Kingdom of Great Britain and Ireland
- Died: 2 November 1980 (aged 83) Brisbane, Queensland, Australia, British Empire

Patrick Mary O'Donnell (2 February 1897 – 2 November 1980) was an Irish-born Roman Catholic priest in Australia. He was Roman Catholic Archbishop of Brisbane in Queensland.

== Early life ==
Patrick O'Donnell was born on 2 February 1897 at Main Street, Fethard, Ireland, the son of Thomas and Johanna O'Donnell, who had a drapery business.

== Religious service ==
Patrick O'Donnell was ordained as the priest of Sale in Victoria, Australia, on 15 April 1922.

On 8 November 1948 O'Donnell was appointed the coadjutor archbishop of the Roman Catholic Archdiocese of Brisbane with the right of succession. He served as coadjutor to Archbishop James Duhig for 16 years until Duhig's death on 10 April 1965, whereupon he succeeded him as Archbishop of Brisbane.

== Later life ==
Patrick O'Donnell retired on 5 March 1973, as the Second Vatican Council had decided that bishops and archbishops should retire at 75 years of age. He installed his successor Francis Roberts Rush in a ceremony on 30 May 1973.

He lived quietly at his home Glengariff in Hendra in Brisbane until his death on 2 November 1980. He was buried in Cathedral of St Stephen, Brisbane beside Archbishop Duhig.

Catholic Church titles
Preceded by James Duhig	4th Roman Catholic Archbishop of Brisbane; 1965–1973	Succeeded by Francis Roberts Rush
