= Romuald Denis Hayes =

Australian bishop (1892-1945)

Romuald Denis Hayes S.S.C.
- Bishop of Rockhampton
- Church: Catholic Church
- Diocese: Diocese of Rockhampton
- In office: 12 January 1932 – 25 October 1945
- Predecessor: Joseph Shiel
- Successor: Andrew Gerard Tynan

Orders
- Ordination: 10 August 1917 by Basilio Pompili
- Consecration: 3 April 1932 by Daniel Mannix

Personal details
- Born: 30 January 1892 Melbourne, Colony of Victoria, British Empire
- Died: 25 October 1945 (aged 53)

Romuald Denis Hayes (10 August 1892 – 25 October 1945) was a Roman Catholic Bishop of Rockhampton in Queensland, Australia, from 2 January 1932 until his death on 25 October 1945. Educated for the priesthood at St. Patricks, Manly, and in Rome. in 1920 he joined the Missionary Society of St. Columban the first Australian to do so, and was sent to their mission in Nebraska, USA.

Catholic Church titles
Preceded by Joseph Shiel	5th Roman Catholic Bishop of Rockhampton; 1932–1945	Succeeded by Andrew Gerard Tynan
