= Francis Roberts Rush =

Australian Roman Catholic archbishop

- Archbishop of Brisbane
- Church: Catholic Church
- Archdiocese: Archdiocese of Brisbane
- In office: 5 March 1973 – 3 December 1991
- Predecessor: Patrick Mary O'Donnell
- Successor: John Bathersby
- Previous post: Bishop of Rockhampton (1960-1973)

Orders
- Ordination: 18 March 1939 by Luigi Traglia
- Consecration: 8 February 1961 by Maximilian von Fürstenberg

Personal details
- Born: 11 September 1916 Townsville, Queensland, Australia, British Empire
- Died: 21 July 2001 (aged 84) Brisbane, Queensland, Australia

Francis Roberts Rush (11 September 1916 – 21 July 2001) was an Australian bishop in the Roman Catholic Church. He was Archbishop of Brisbane from 1973 to 1991. He had previously been Bishop of Rockhampton from 1960.

== Early life ==
Francis Roberts Rush was born in Townsville, Queensland, on 11 September 1916. He was the son of Thomas Rush and his wife Mary (née Roberts).

== Religious life ==
Rush was ordained as a priest in Rome on 18 March 1939. From 1939 to 1945, he was as a priest at Sacred Heart Cathedral, Townsville.

Rush was appointed Bishop of Rockhampton on 7 November 1960, where he implemented many of the reforms of the Second Vatican Council.

Rush was appointed Archbishop of Brisbane on 5 March 1973, replacing the retiring Patrick Mary O'Donnell.

== Later life ==
Rush retired on 3 December 1991 and lived in Brisbane in retirement. He died on 21 July 2001. His funeral was held at the Cathedral of St Stephen, Brisbane, on 27 July 2001 presided by Archbishop John Bathersby; nearly one thousand people packed into the 800-seat cathedral with many standing in the aisles to farewell him.

Catholic Church titles
Preceded by Andrew Gerard Tynan	7th Bishop of Rockhampton; 1960–1973	Succeeded by Bernard Joseph Wallace
Preceded by Patrick Mary O'Donnell	5th Archbishop of Brisbane; 1973–1991	Succeeded by John Bathersby
