= Respecta, Numidia =

Respecta, was a Roman era town and the seat of an ancient Christian bishopric in what was Numidia, Roman North Africa. Both lasted till the Muslim conquest of the Maghreb at the end of the 7th century.

It is now a titular see of the Roman Catholic Church. The current bishop of the diocese is Joseph John Oudeman, who was appointed in 2002. Previous titular bishops were Cardinal Paulo Evaristo Arns (1966–1970); Bishop Alexis Pham Van Luc (March 1975-October 1975); Cardinal James Francis Stafford (1976-1982); and Henricus Cornelius de Wit (1982-2002).
