= Roman Catholic Archdiocese of Brisbane =

Catholic ecclesiastical territory

Metropolitan Archdiocese of Brisbane Archidioecesis Metropolitae Brisbanensis
- Coat of arms of the Archdiocese of Brisbane

Location
- Country: Australia
- Territory: South east region of Queensland, including Greater Brisbane
- Ecclesiastical province: Brisbane
- Coordinates: 27°27′56″S 153°02′41″E

Statistics
- Area: 65,000 km^{2} (25,000 sq mi)
- Population: Total; Catholics: (as of 2012); 2,849,000; 663,000 (23.3%)
- Parishes: 103

Information
- Denomination: Catholic Church
- Sui iuris church: Latin Church
- Rite: Roman Rite
- Established: 12 April 1859 as the Diocese of Brisbane; 10 May 1887 as the Archdiocese of Brisbane
- Cathedral: Cathedral of St Stephen
- Patron saint: Mary MacKillop
- Secular priests: 245

Current leadership
- Pope: Leo XIV
- Metropolitan Archbishop: Shane Anthony Mackinlay
- Auxiliary Bishops: Position vacant
- Bishops emeritus: Mark Coleridge, Brian Vincent Finnigan; Joseph John Oudeman OFMCap

Map

Website
- bne.catholic.net.au

The Metropolitan Archdiocese of Brisbane is a Latin Church metropolitan archdiocese of the Catholic Church in Australia centred in Brisbane and covering the south east region of Queensland, Australia.

Part of the Ecclesiastical Province of Brisbane, the region covered was initially administered by the Archdiocese of Sydney. In 1859 the Diocese of Brisbane was erected, and elevated as an archdiocese in 1887. The archdiocese is the metropolitan of the suffragan dioceses of Cairns, Rockhampton, Toowoomba and Townsville.

The Cathedral of St Stephen is the seat of the Archbishop of Brisbane. On 12 May 2012, Mark Coleridge was installed as the sixth Archbishop of Brisbane, the seventh Bishop of Brisbane. On 11 September 2025, Shane Mackinlay was installed as the seventh Archbishop of Brisbane, the eighth Bishop of Brisbane.

Mary MacKillop is the patroness saint of the Archdiocese of Brisbane.

== History ==
The Diocese of Brisbane was established in 1859, with responsibility for the entire state of Queensland. Prior to its establishment, Queensland was part of the Roman Catholic Archdiocese of Sydney.

On 27 January 1877, Pope Pius IX excised the northern part of the Diocese of Brisbane from Cape Hinchinbrook and then west to the border with South Australia (now the Northern Territory) to create the Vicariate Apostolic of Queensland (later the Diocese of Cairns).

On 29 December 1882, the Diocese of Rockhampton was excised from the Archdiocese of Brisbane. The new Rockhampton diocese had responsibility for northern Queensland while the Brisbane archdiocese retained responsibility for southern Queensland.

In 1929, the Diocese of Toowoomba was excised from the Archdiocese of Brisbane.

== Bishops ==
=== Ordinaries ===
The following people have been appointed as archbishops of Brisbane or any of its precursor titles:

Order	Name	Title	Date enthroned	Reign ended	Term of office	Reason for term end
1	James Quinn †	Bishop of Brisbane	14 April 1859	18 August 1881	22 years, 126 days	Died in office
2	Robert Dunne †	Bishop of Brisbane	3 January 1882	10 May 1887	5 years, 127 days	Elevated as Archbishop of Brisbane
2	Robert Dunne †	Archbishop of Brisbane	10 May 1887	13 January 1917	29 years, 248 days	Died in office
3	James Duhig †	Coadjutor Archbishop of Brisbane	27 February 1912	13 January 1917	4 years, 321 days	Succeeded as Archbishop of Brisbane
3	James Duhig †	Archbishop of Brisbane	13 January 1917	10 April 1965	48 years, 87 days	Died in office
4	Patrick Mary O'Donnell †	Coadjutor Archbishop of Brisbane	8 November 1948	10 April 1965	16 years, 153 days	Succeeded as Archbishop of Brisbane
4	Patrick Mary O'Donnell †	Archbishop of Brisbane	10 April 1965	5 March 1973	7 years, 329 days	Retired and titled Archbishop Emeritus of Brisbane
5	Francis Roberts Rush †	Archbishop of Brisbane	5 March 1973	3 December 1991	18 years, 273 days	Retired and titled Archbishop Emeritus of Brisbane
6	John Bathersby †	Archbishop of Brisbane	3 December 1991	14 November 2011	19 years, 346 days	Retired and titled Archbishop Emeritus of Brisbane
7	Mark Coleridge	Archbishop of Brisbane	11 May 2012	11 September 2025	13 years, 123 days	Retired and titled Archbishop Emeritus of Brisbane
8	Shane Mackinlay	Archbishop of Brisbane	11 September 2025		1 year, 66 days	

Coadjutors are included in the table above.

=== Auxiliary bishops ===
Current

- None, Position vacant

Former

- Henry Joseph Kennedy † (1967–1971), appointed Bishop of Armidale
- John Joseph Gerry † (1975–2003)
- Eugene James Cuskelly MSC † (1982–1996)
- Michael Ernest Putney † (1995–2001), appointed Bishop of Townsville
- Brian Vincent Finnigan (2002–2015)
- Joseph John Oudeman OFMCap (2002–2017)
- Kenneth Howell (2017–2023), appointed Bishop of Toowoomba
- Tim Norton SVD (2022–2024), appointed Bishop of Broome

=== Other priests of the diocese who became bishops ===
- James Byrne †, appointed Bishop of Toowoomba in 1929
- Andrew Gerard Tynan †, appointed Bishop of Rockhampton in 1946
- Edward John Doody †, appointed Bishop of Armidale in 1948
- John Ahern Torpie †, appointed Bishop of Cairns in 1967
- Brian Heenan, appointed Bishop of Rockhampton in 1991
- James Foley, appointed Bishop of Cairns in 1992
- William Martin Morris, appointed Bishop of Toowoomba in 1992
- Michael Fabian McCarthy, appointed Bishop of Rockhampton in 2014
- Anthony Randazzo, appointed an Auxiliary Bishop of Sydney in 2016
- Timothy James Harris, appointed Bishop of Townsville in 2017

== Cathedral ==
The gothic revival cathedral is located on a site bounded by Elizabeth, Charlotte and Edward Streets, in the Australian city of Brisbane. Built between 1864 and 1922, with extensions made in 1989, the cathedral was established with James Quinn as its first bishop. Quinn planned to construct a large cathedral to accommodate a growing congregation. On 26 December 1863, the Feast of Saint Stephen, Quinn laid the foundation stone for a grand cathedral designed by Benjamin Backhouse. Backhouse's original design was changed and downsized numerous times over the course of the cathedral's completion, mainly for economic reasons.

In 1927, there was a plan to replace St Stephen's with a new Holy Name Cathedral to be built in Fortitude Valley, Brisbane. However, funding was only sufficient to build the crypt. Eventually the project was abandoned, the crypt demolished and the land sold.

== Parishes ==
- Acacia Ridge – Our Lady of Fatima
- Albany Creek – All Saints
- Alexandra Hills – St Anthony
- Annerley Ekibin Catholic Parish
- Ashgrove – St Finbarr (Jubilee Catholic Parish)
- Aspley – Our Lady & St Dympna
- Auchenflower – St Ignatius
- Banyo Nundah Parish
- Bardon – St Mary Magdalen (Jubilee Catholic Parish)
- Beaudesert – St Mary's
- Beenleigh – St Patrick
- Birkdale – St Mary Mackillop
- Boonah – All Saints
- Booval – Sacred Heart
- Bowen Hills – Our Lady of Victories
- Bracken Ridge – St Joseph & St Anthony
- Bray Park – Holy Spirit
- Brisbane – Cathedral of St Stephen
- Browns Plains – St Bernardine
- Bulimba – St Peter and Paul
- Buranda – St Luke
- Burleigh Heads – Infant Saviour
- Burpengary – St Eugene de Mazenod
- Caboolture – St Peter
- Caloundra – Our Lady of the Rosary
- Camp Hill – St Thomas
- Cannon Hill – St Oliver Plunkett
- Capalaba – St Lukes
- Carina – Our Lady of Graces
- Chermside West – St Gerard Majella
- Childers – Sacred Heart
- Clayfield – St Agatha
- Cleveland – Star of the Sea
- Coolangatta – St Augustine's
- Coomera – St Mary's Catholic Community
- Coorparoo – Our Lady of Mt Carmel
- Coorparoo – St James Parish
- Coorparoo Heights – Regina Caeli
- Corinda – Graceville Parish
- Daisy Hill – St Edward the Confessor
- Darra Jindalee – Our Lady of the Sacred Heart / Twelve Apostles
- Dorrington – St Michael's
- Dutton Park – St Ita
- Enoggera – St John the Baptist
- Esk – St Mel
- Everton Park – Immaculate Conception
- Gatton – St Mary's
- Gayndah – St Joseph
- Geebung – St Kevin's
- Goodna – St Francis Xavier
- Gordon Park – St Carthage
- Greenslopes – St Maroun's
- Grovely – St William's
- Gympie – St Patrick's
- Hamilton – St Cecilia's
- Hendra – Our Lady Help of Christians
- Herston – St Joan of Arc (Jubilee Catholic Parish)
- Hervey Bay City Parish
- Holland Park – Mt Gravatt
- Inala – St Mark's
- Indooroopilly – Holy Family
- Ipswich – St Mary's
- Kangaroo Point – East Brisbane – St Joseph's
- Kedron – St Therese – The Little Flower
- Kenmore – Our Lady of the Rosary
- Kingaroy – St Mary's
- Kingston – Marsden – St Maximilian Kolbe
- Laidley – St Patrick's
- Leichhardt – Immaculate Heart of Mary
- Loganholme – St Matthew's
- Lutwyche Parish
- Manly – St John Vianney
- Maroochydore – Stella Maris
- Maryborough – St Mary's
- Mitchelton – Our Lady of Dolours
- Moorooka Salisbury
- Murgon – St Joseph's
- Nambour – St Joseph's
- Nanango – Our Lady Help of Christians
- Nerang – St Brigid's
- New Farm – Holy Spirit
- Newmarket – St Ambrose (Jubilee Catholic Parish)
- Noosa District – Our Lady of Perpetual Succour
- North Ipswich – St Joseph
- North Lakes/Mango Hill - St Benedict's
- Petrie – Our Lady of the Way
- Pine Rivers – Holy Spirit
- Red Hill – St Brigid (Jubilee Catholic Parish)
- Redcliffe – Holy Cross
- Rochedale – St Peter's
- Rosalie – Sacred Heart (Jubilee Catholic Parish)
- Rosewood – St Brigid's
- Runaway Bay – Holy Family
- Sandgate – Brighton Parish
- South Brisbane – St Mary's
- South Brisbane – St Clements
- Southport – Mary Immaculate
- Springfield – Our Lady of the Southern Cross
- St John's Wood – The Gap Parish
- St Lucia – St Thomas Aquinas
- Stafford – Our Lady Queen of Apostles
- Stanley River Parish
- Sunnybank – Our Lady of Lourdes
- Surfers Paradise Parish
- Toowong – St Ignatius
- Upper Mt Gravatt – Wishart Parish
- Victoria Point – St Rita
- Wavell Heights – St Paschal
- Wilston – St Columba
- Woodridge – St Paul's
- Woolloongabba – Protection of the Mother of God
- Wynnum – Guardian Angels
- Yeronga – St Sebastian
- Zillmere – St Flannan's

== Economic contribution ==
The archdiocese contributes around $2.5 billion to the economy through its schools and other institutions, providing employment to 22,000 people.

The archdiocese manages 98 parishes and 144 Catholic schools. It also provides services to 12,992 aged care and disability clients, support for 8362 seniors to live at home, support to 23,000 victims of domestic violence and help for 4,000 people with mental illness.

== See also ==
- Roman Catholicism in Australia
