= Robert Dunne (bishop) =

Australian bishop

- Archbishop of Brisbane
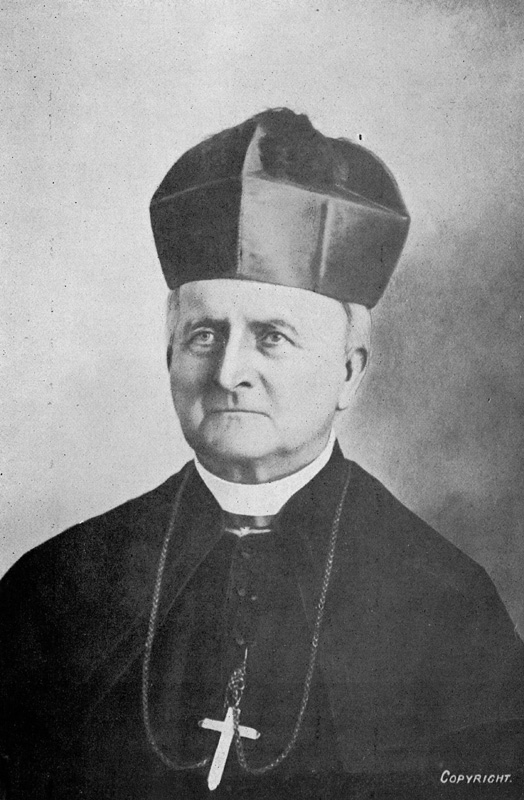

Orders
- Consecration: 18 June 1882

Personal details
- Born: 5 September 1830 Ardfinnan
- Died: 13 January 1917 (aged 86) Brisbane

Robert Dunne (5 September 1830 – 13 January 1917) was the second Roman Catholic bishop of Brisbane, and later became its first archbishop.

Catholic Church titles
Preceded by James Quinn	2nd Catholic Bishop of Brisbane; 1882–1887	Succeeded by n/a
Preceded by n/a	1st Catholic Archbishop of Brisbane; 1887–1917	Succeeded by James Duhig
