= St Joseph's Cathedral, Rockhampton =

- Cathedral of Saint Joseph
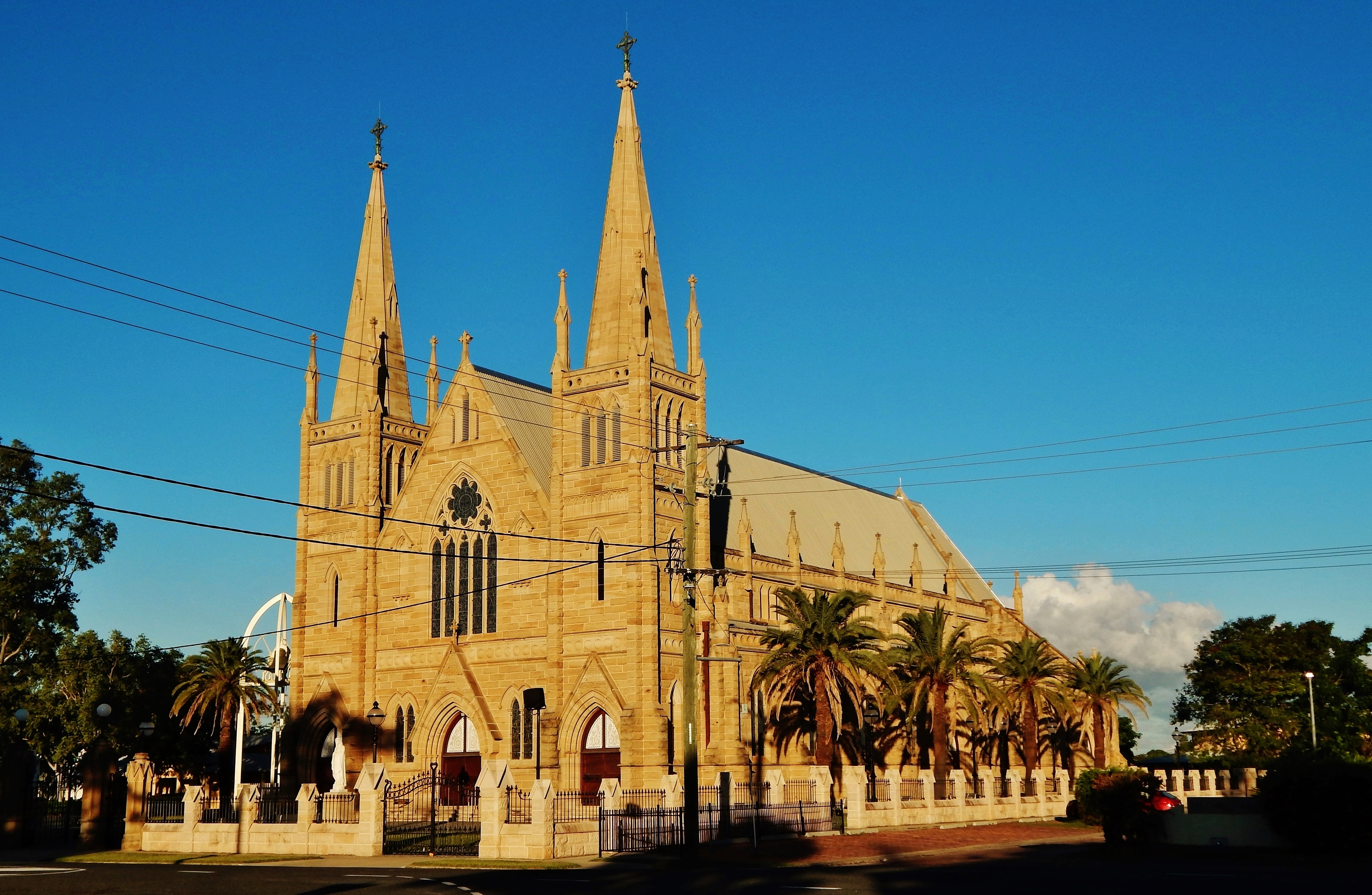
- St Joseph's Cathedral, 2020
- St Joseph's Cathedral, Rockhampton
- Location: Rockhampton, Queensland
- Country: Australia
- Denomination: Catholic Church
- Website: www.rok.catholic.net.au

History
- Status: Cathedral (since 1893); Church (1863–1892)
- Founded: 11 June 1894
- Consecrated: 15 October 1899

Architecture
- Functional status: Active
- Heritage designation: Queensland Heritage Register
- Designated: 21 October 1992
- Architect: Francis Drummond Greville Stanley
- Architectural type: Church
- Style: Neo-Gothic
- Years built: 1893–1982
- Groundbreaking: 1896
- Completed: 1982

Administration
- Archdiocese: Brisbane
- Diocese: Rockhampton

Clergy
- Bishop: Danny Meagher
- Vicar: Fr Alex Varghese

St Joseph's Cathedral, Rockhampton
- Location within Queensland Location within Australia
- 23.3862°S 150.5065°E
- Location: 170 William Street, Allenstown, Rockhampton, Rockhampton Region, Queensland, Australia

History
- Design period: 1870s–1890s (late 19th century)
- Built: 1893–1982

Site notes
- Architect: Francis Drummond Greville Stanley
- Architectural style: Gothic

Queensland Heritage Register
- Official name: St Josephs Cathedral
- Type: state heritage (built)
- Designated: 21 October 1992
- Reference no.: 600822
- Significant period: 1890s, 1980s (historical); 1890s–1900s, 1980s (fabric) ongoing (social)
- Significant components: tower, cathedral, views to, furniture/fittings, stained glass window/s

St Josephs Cathedral is a heritage-listed Roman Catholic cathedral at 170 William Street, Allenstown, Rockhampton, Rockhampton Region, Queensland, Australia. It was designed by Francis Drummond Greville Stanley and built from 1893 to 1982. It was added to the Queensland Heritage Register on 21 October 1992. The cathedral serves as the seat for the Bishop of Rockhampton.

== History ==
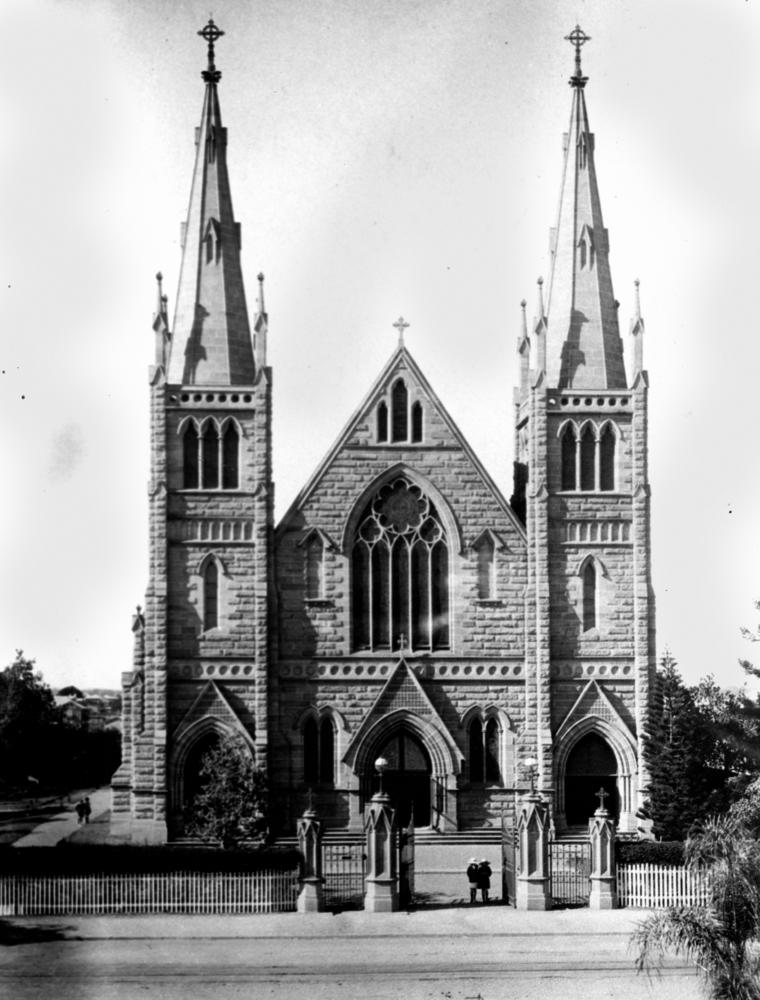
St. Joseph's Cathedral in Rockhampton, 1923

St Joseph's Roman Catholic Cathedral was constructed in 1893–1899 as the first catholic cathedral of Rockhampton manifesting the creation of the Roman Catholic Diocese of Rockhampton in 1882. The building was designed by prominent Brisbane architects, FDG Stanley and Son.

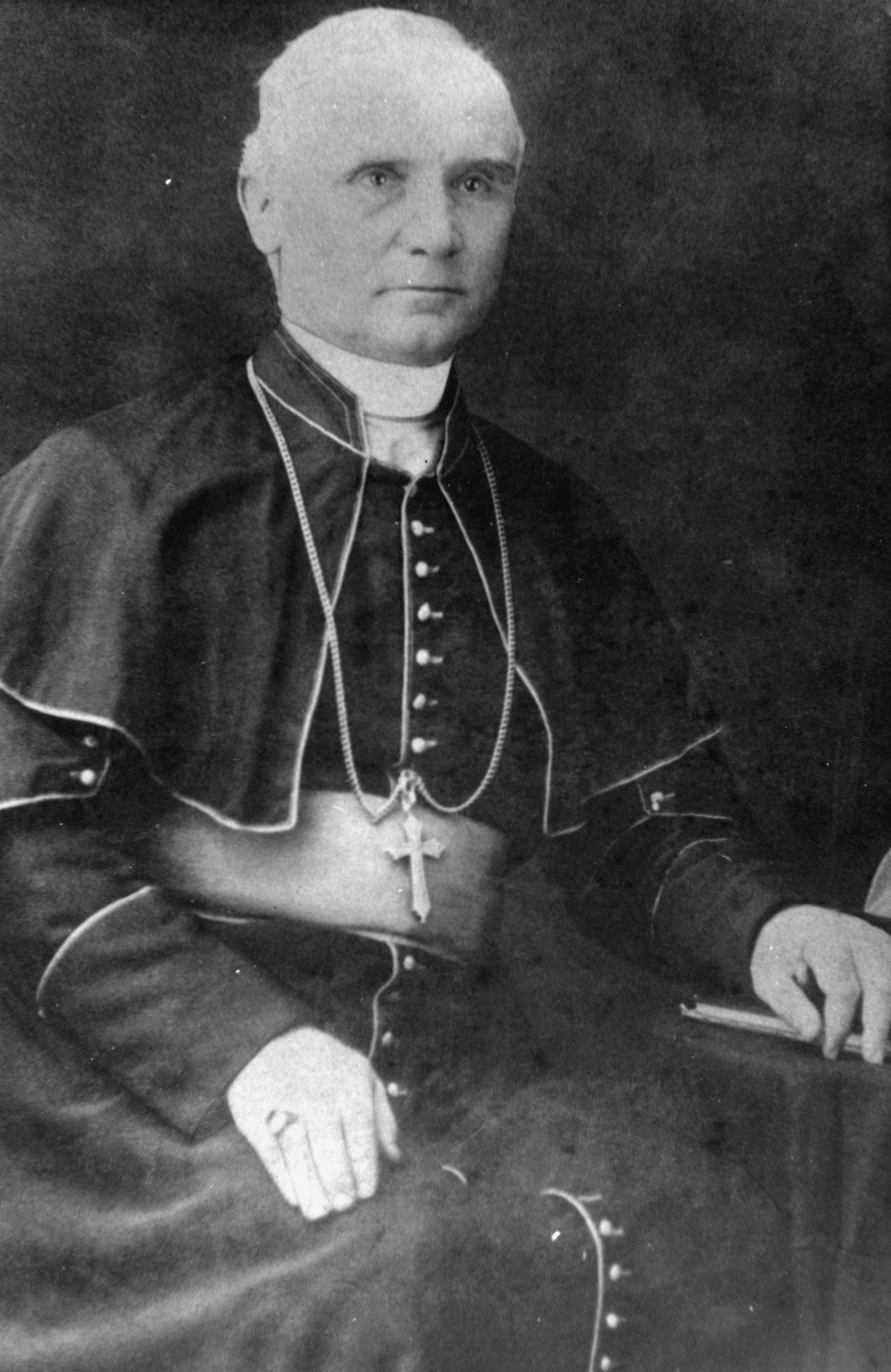
Giovanni John Cani, Bishop of Rockhampton from 1882 to 1898

The first official Roman Catholic service in Rockhampton was held in May 1862, when Bishop James Quinn of Roman Catholic Diocese of Brisbane sent two young priests on a pastoral visit. Father James Scully and Father Patrick Duhig arrived aboard the Clarence and celebrated Mass in the local Court House with about fifty Roman Catholic people. Whilst in Rockhampton the two priests instigated a fund raising exercise to support the construction of a church. This building was opened by Father J Moynahan on 4 January 1863, dedicated to St Joseph. Its location was on the corner of Derby and Alma Streets. Father Charles Murlay, later Dean Murlay, was appointed to the Rockhampton parish and looked after an area extending from Gladstone to Townsville and west to Blackall. In 1876 Bishop Quinn suggested that a site be found for the construction of a suitable cathedral as the parish was to become a Diocese. Land in William Street was secured by February 1877 and by 1883 the parish had raised £4000 for the construction of a cathedral. On 21 May 1882 Bishop John Cani was consecrated as the first Bishop of Rockhampton and he planned in earnest for the construction of a cathedral.

Plans were prepared by Brisbane architects FDG Stanley and Son. Francis Drummond Greville Stanley was responsible for the design of many substantial churches throughout Queensland including St Patrick's Roman Catholic Church at Gympie, Holy Trinity Anglican Church at Fortitude Valley and St Paul's Presbyterian Church at Spring Hill. Tenders were called for the construction of the cathedral in Rockhampton and construction began on 11 June 1894. A foundation stone was laid by Bishop Cani on Sunday 17 March 1895. Sandstone stone was quarried for the building from Stanwell Quarry, about 24 kilometres (15 mi) west of Rockhampton and owned by Bishop Cani.

Cani died on 3 March 1898 before the completion of St Joseph's Cathedral. As it was the custom of the Roman Catholic Church to bury a bishop within his cathedral, arrangements were made to bury Cani temporarily in the Rockhampton Cemetery with the intention to bury him permanently within the cathedral once completed. His successor, Bishop Joseph Higgins, arrived on 20 July 1899 to a building only partially completed. Within two months of his arrival the cathedral was completed with a temporary east wall. Apparently local architects, Eaton and Bates were involved with the design of this final stage of construction. On 15 October 1899, an official opening ceremony was held when Cardinal Patrick Francis Moran of the Sydney Archdiocese celebrated Pontifical High Mass.

On 22 July 1902, the remains of Bishop Cani were exhumed and re-interred in St Joseph's Cathedral in a "brief but impressive" ceremony. His remains were placed in a vault under a memorial window dedicated to him by the Sisters of Mercy.

In 1918, the cathedral's flying buttresses were removed and strengthened. In 1980 the church received advice that the temporary wall of 1899 was unsafe and a programme was instigated for finally finishing the building. On 22 May 1982 Cardinal Sir James Darcy Freeman, Archbishop of Sydney, dedicated the completed cathedral. In 1987 the stained glass panels, first erected in the church in the first decade of the twentieth century, were returned to John Hardman Studios in England where they were restored before being returned to the St Joseph's Cathedral.

== Description ==
St Joseph's Roman Catholic Cathedral is a substantial sandstone building with traditional cruciform plan, comprising a nave, side aisles, transepts, apsidal chancel and two towers flanking the western front of the building. The cathedral is constructed from rockfaced coursed sandstone, with smooth faced sandstone detailing including coursing, mouldings, window and door surrounds and tracery.

The principal facade of the building, the west front, is symmetrically composed and comprises a central entrance, a large traceried window above, several smaller openings and all flanked by two large towers. The towers are surmounted by broach spires, constructed from ashlar sandstone. The principal entrance to the building is through a pointed arched opening recessed in a heavily moulded doorway set within a projecting porch element with steeply pitched gabled awning. On the face of the gabled section, above the doorway is diaper work carved in the stone.

The interior of the church is traditionally arranged, with a nave separated from side aisles by a pointed arched arcade. A narthex area, near the entrance, is also separated by a pointed arched arcade. The arcades are of ashlar sandstone and comprise simple round columns with moulded caps surmounted by moulded arches. The ceiling is vaulted to the shape of a shallow pointed arch and clad with horizontal timber boarding and lined with several heavy timber pointed arched rafters. The clerestory is formed with groups of three pointed arched openings. A gallery at the western front end of the church is supported above the narthex on the arcade separating the narthex from the nave.

The interior of St Joseph's Cathedral houses many finely crafted items, including a black and white Italian marble "checkerboard" tiled floor and a number of stained and coloured glass panels depicting scenes from the New Testament. The stained glass windows were designed and manufactured by John Hardman and Son of England.

== Heritage listing ==
St Joseph's Cathedral was listed on the Queensland Heritage Register on 21 October 1992 having satisfied the following criteria.

The place is important in demonstrating the evolution or pattern of Queensland's history.

The cathedral demonstrates the growth of Rockhampton during the late nineteenth century. The substantial sandstone building constructed in 1892–3 as the first Roman Catholic Cathedral in Rockhampton reflecting the creation of the Diocese of Rockhampton in 1882.

The place is important in demonstrating the principal characteristics of a particular class of cultural places.

The building is characteristic of substantial Gothic revival cathedrals, with sandstone construction, cruciform plan, Gothic detailing, steeply pitched roof, towers with spires, stained glass panels and internal furnishings and fittings.

The place is important because of its aesthetic significance.

The building has aesthetic merit as a well composed building and a Rockhampton landmark.

The place has a strong or special association with a particular community or cultural group for social, cultural or spiritual reasons.

The building has special associations for the Roman Catholic Community of central and north Queensland as their cathedral.

The place has a special association with the life or work of a particular person, group or organisation of importance in Queensland's history.

The building is associated with the architect, FDG Stanley and with many influential archbishops of the Rockhampton Diocese.
