= Cathedral of St Stephen, Brisbane =

Heritage-listed cathedral in Brisbane, Queensland

St Stephen's Cathedral
- Cathedral of St Stephen
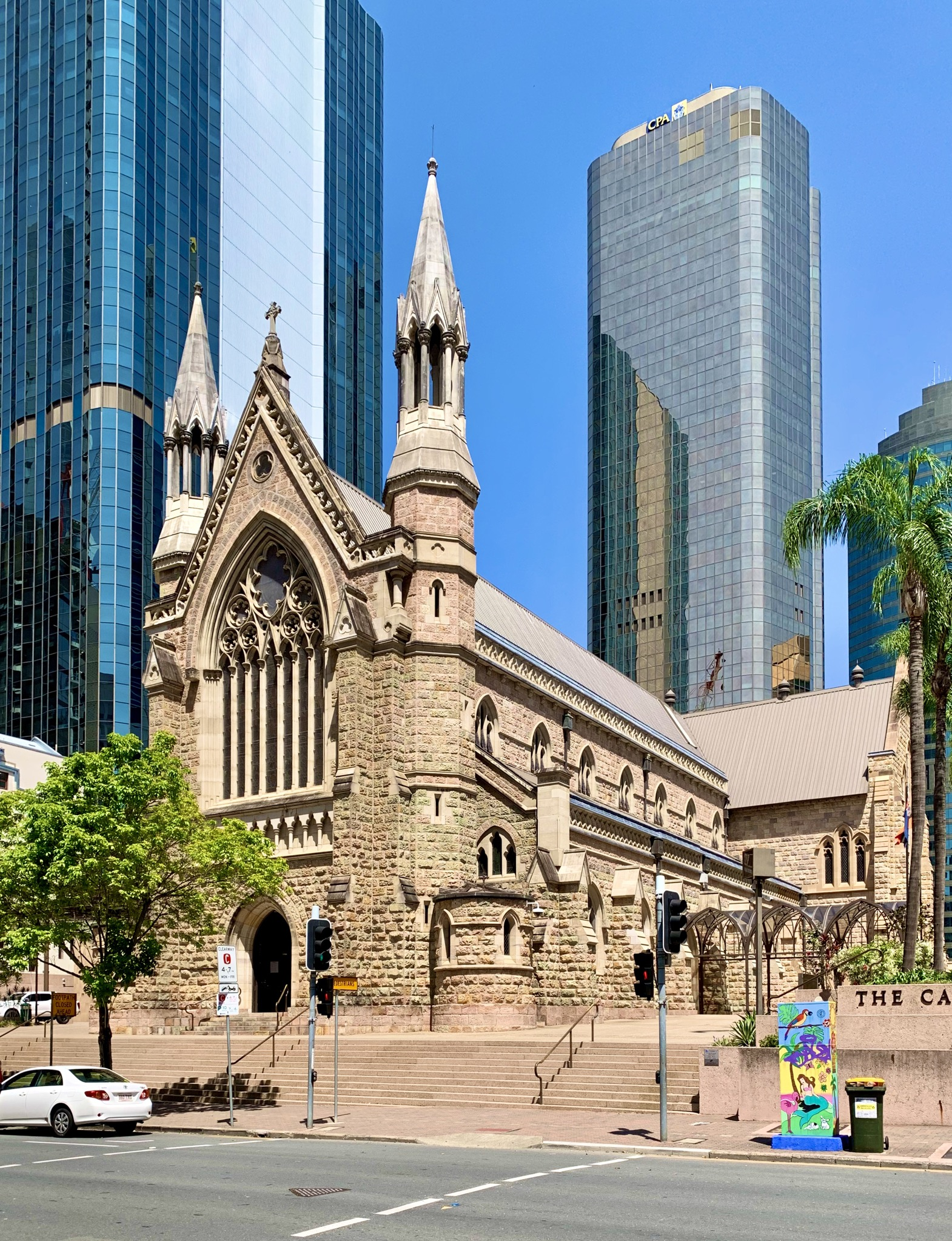
- St Stephen's Cathedral
- 27°28′07″S 153°01′44″E
- Address: 259–269 Elizabeth Street, Brisbane, Queensland
- Country: Australia
- Denomination: Roman Catholic
- Website: cathedralofststephen.org.au

History
- Status: Cathedral
- Consecrated: 17 May 1874

Architecture
- Architect: Benjamin Backhouse
- Architectural type: Church
- Style: Gothic Revival
- Groundbreaking: 26 December 1863
- Completed: 1989

Administration
- Archdiocese: Brisbane

Clergy
- Archbishop: Shane Mackinlay

Queensland Heritage Register
- Official name: St Stephen's Cathedral, St Stephen's Catholic Cathedral
- Type: State heritage (built, landscape)
- Designated: 21 October 1992
- Reference no.: 600107

The Cathedral of St Stephen is the heritage-listed cathedral church of the Roman Catholic Archdiocese of Brisbane and seat of its archbishop in Brisbane, Queensland, Australia. St Stephen's was only meant to serve as a temporary seat for the archbishop, and plans for a replacement were made with the Holy Name Cathedral; however that cathedral was never built.

== History ==
The cathedral, named for the first century martyr Saint Stephen, is located on a site bounded by Elizabeth, Charlotte, Creek, and Edward Streets, in the Australian city of Brisbane, Queensland. James Quinn, the first bishop of Brisbane, arrived in 1861 from Ireland, and soon planned to build a large cathedral to accommodate a growing congregation. On 26 December 1863, the Feast of Saint Stephen, Quinn laid the foundation stone for a grand cathedral designed by Benjamin Backhouse, but this did not at first proceed beyond the foundations. R George Suter was then commissioned to design a smaller, simpler church partly on the foundations, and the current nave was built 1870–74, with the front gables and spires completed 1884. No further was undertaken until James Duhig took up the archbishopric in 1917. With plans to build new larger Holy Name Cathedral in Fortitude Valley, he engaged architects Hennessy, Hennessy & Co to complete St Stephen's with a crossing, transepts and sanctuary in a simpler design than intended, which was built in 1920–22.

== Description ==
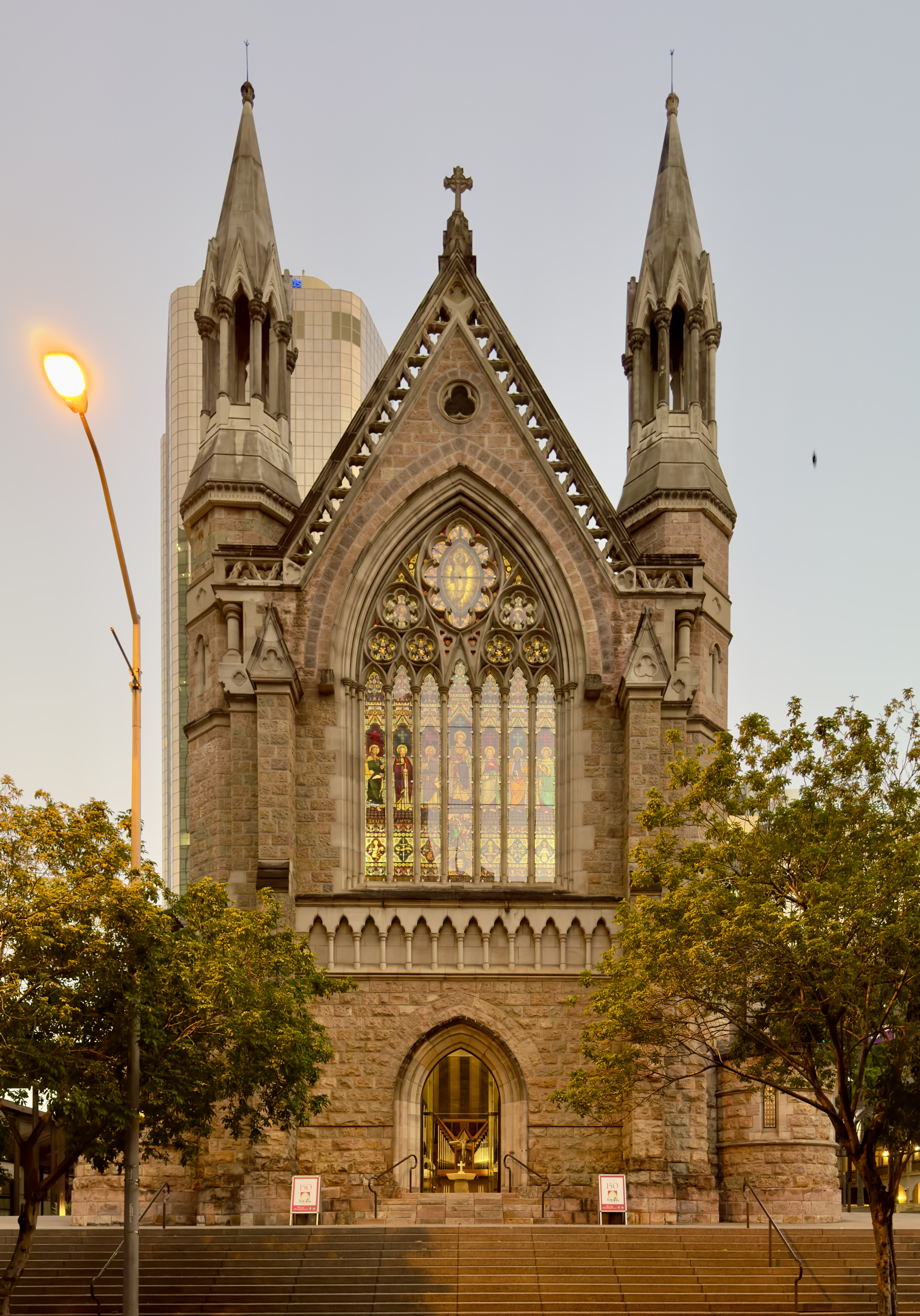
Cathedral of St Stephen, Brisbane, west front at dusk, 2024

St Stephen's is a gothic revival cathedral with a cruciform shape in plan. While this is a plain cathedral by comparison it still has a selection of striking features such as the spire topped sandstone towers, imported stained glass windows from Munich, the organ, the altar and the newer Blessed Sacrament Chapel at the rear of the building. Of particular note is the stained glass window by Harry Clarke, known as the "Mayne" window, which is located above the sanctuary on the east wall. The cathedral is made predominantly of Brisbane tuff and freestone. The Blessed Sacrament Chapel is made from reinforced concrete and the restored spires from glass reinforced concrete.

Inside the cathedral, sunlight passes through the stained-glass windows, projecting coloured patterns onto the floor and walls. Some of the windows depict Christ and his followers, while the large window above the main entrance depicts the Ascension of Christ. The cathedral also features lightweight plaster ceilings with curved forms.There is a noted contrast between the interior and exterior qualities of space. The interior has a cool and refreshing quality.

== Restoration and refurbishment ==
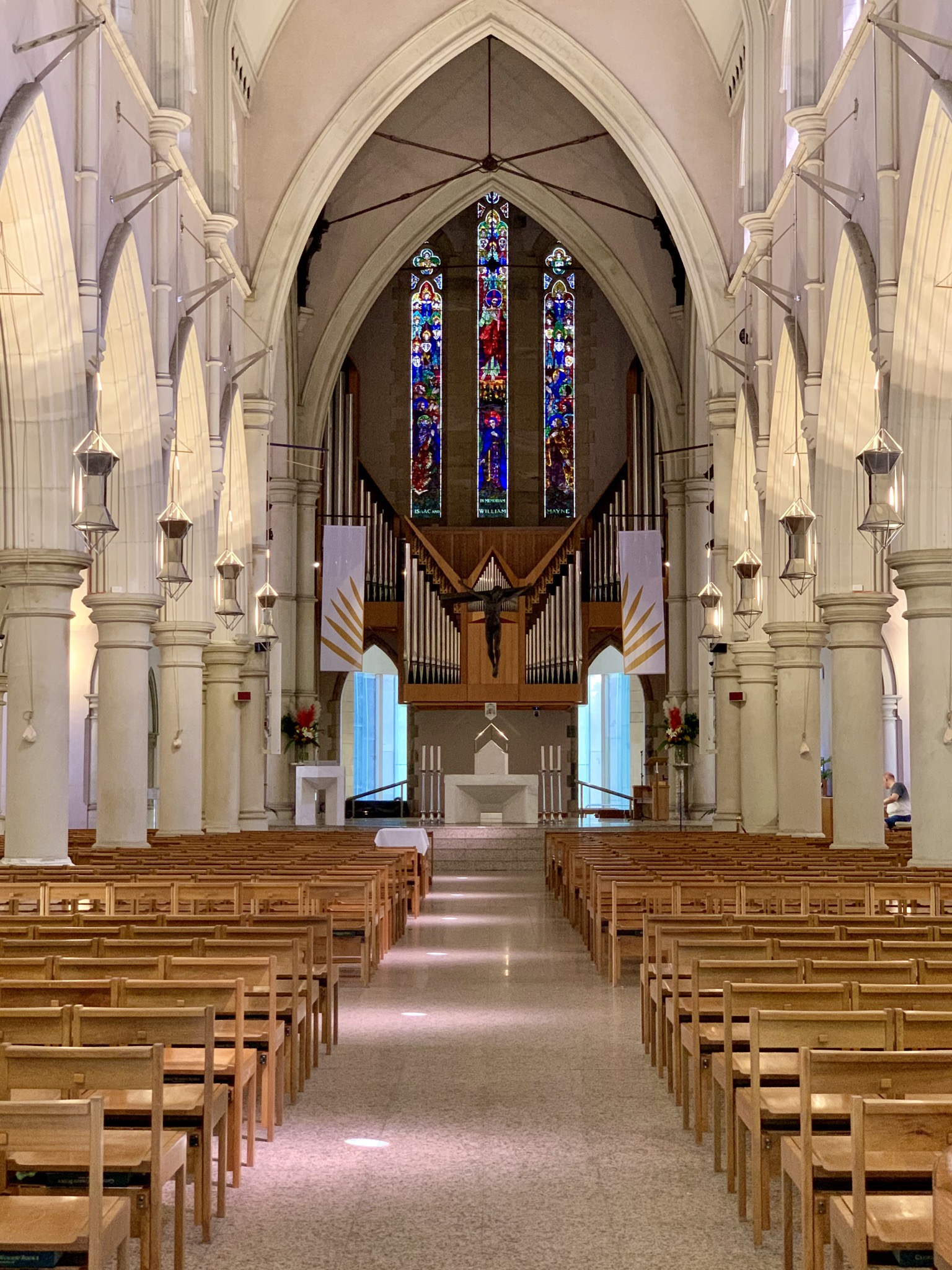
Nave looking east to the high altar

By the 1980s the cathedral had fallen into a state of disrepair. The interior layout of the building was also unsuitable for the new Catholic liturgy. When it became clear that the planned Holy Name Cathedral, the construction of which had never proceeded beyond the completion of its crypt in 1934, would not proceed, it was decided that St Stephen's and its grounds would undergo major refurbishment which would involve preserving the fabric of the building but replacing all furnishings and interior fittings. As part of the refurbishment the cathedral grounds were enlarged and a carpark was built under the extended east end of the cathedral. The last stage of the cathedral restoration was completed in 2000 when the Jubilee Pipe Organ was installed above the sanctuary.

== Cathedral grounds ==
In addition to the cathedral, the site contains numerous buildings that support the cathedral and the Archdiocese of Brisbane.

St Stephen's Chapel (also known as Old St Stephen's Church) stands immediately to the south-west of the cathedral. The chapel was designed by English architect Augustus Pugin and built between 1847 and 1850. The first Mass was celebrated in the completed building on 12 May 1850. In June 1859 it became the cathedral for the first Bishop of Brisbane. It is the oldest Catholic church in Queensland.

Old St Stephen's School is a three level building facing Charlotte Street. This building was the location of St Stephen's School until the 1960s. The building now contains offices for the Archdiocese of Brisbane.

The Francis Rush Centre was completed in July 2005. The two storey building is the location for the cathedral's administration centre, the offices of the bishops, the choir room and several function and meeting rooms. A new under cover outdoor liturgical space was constructed as part of this development and facilitates special liturgies such as the Easter Vigil and Palm Sunday.
