= St Mary's Presbytery, Warwick =

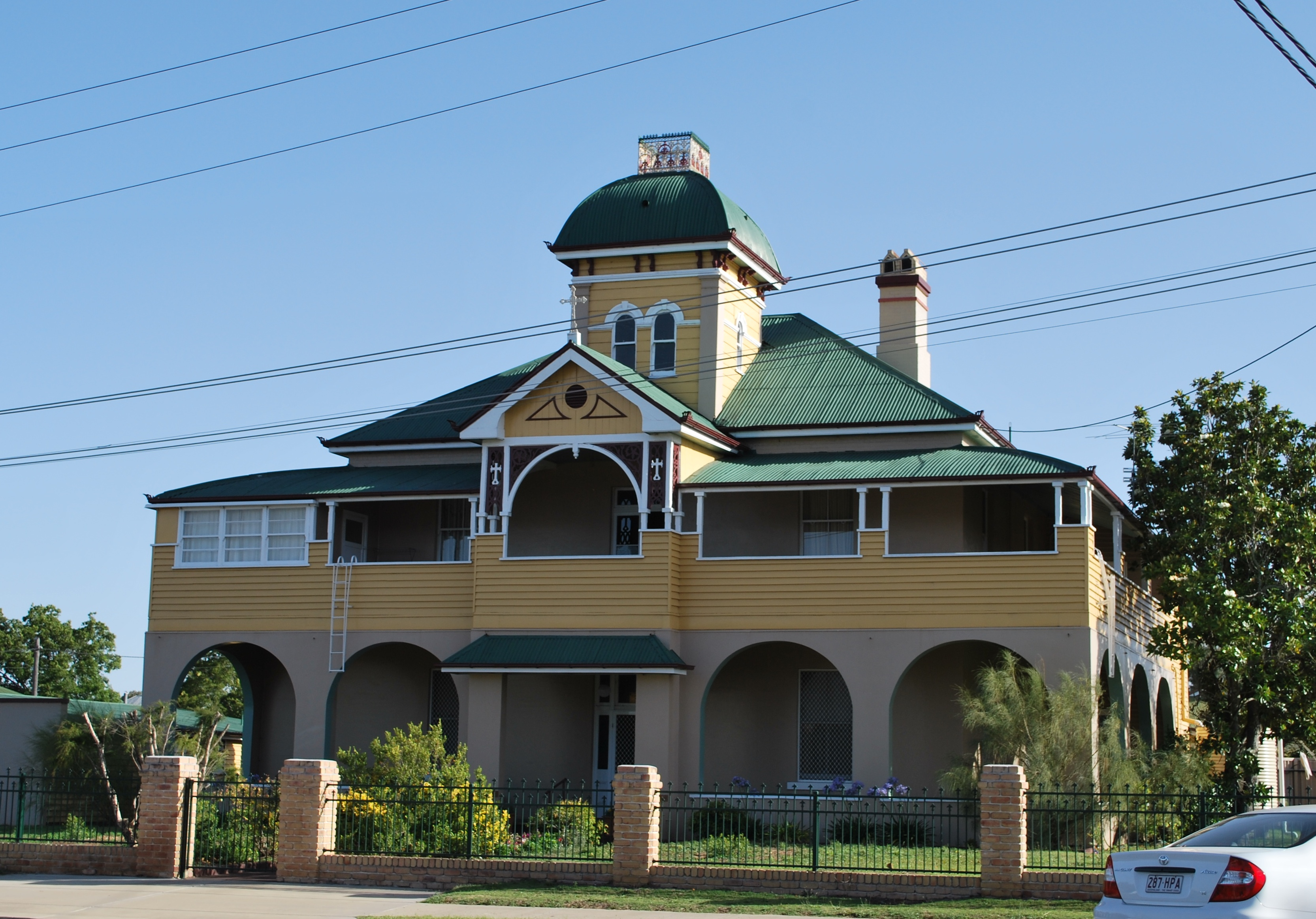
- St Mary's Presbytery, 2008

- Location within Queensland Location within Australia
- 28.2188°S 152.0328°E
- Location: 142 Palmerin Street, Warwick, Southern Downs Region, Queensland, Australia

History
- Design period: 1870s–1890s (late 19th century)
- Built: 1885–1887

Site notes
- Architect: Wallace & Gibson
- Architectural style: Classicism

Queensland Heritage Register
- Official name: St Mary's Presbytery, Former Father JJ Horan's Private residence
- Type: state heritage (built)
- Designated: 31 July 2008
- Reference no.: 602585
- Significant period: 1880s
- Significant components: tower – observation/lookout
- Builders: John McCulloch

St Mary's Presbytery is a heritage-listed Roman Catholic presbytery of St Mary's Roman Catholic Church at 142 Palmerin Street, Warwick, Southern Downs Region, Queensland, Australia. It was designed by Wallace & Gibson and built from 1885 to 1887 by John McCulloch. It is also known as Father JJ Horan's private residence. It was added to the Queensland Heritage Register on 31 July 2008.

== History ==
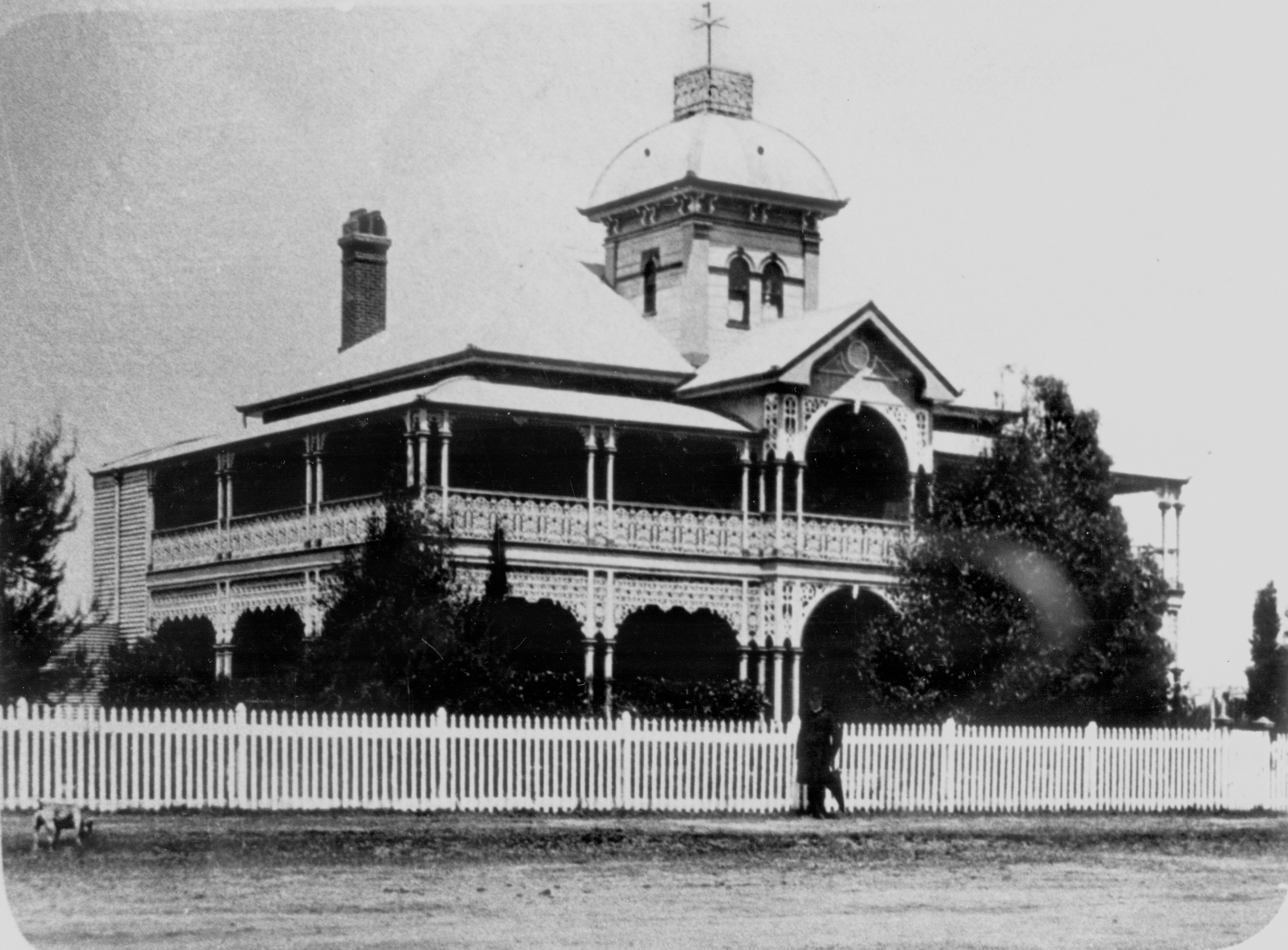
St Mary's Presbytery, circa 1895

St Mary's Presbytery, Warwick, was built 1885–1887 to the design of local architects Wallace and Gibson for Roman Catholic parish priest Father James Horan.

By the late 1850s, Warwick was the principal urban settlement on the southern Darling Downs, a service centre for the surrounding agricultural district. In 1862 Warwick became a large separate parish within the Roman Catholic Diocese of Brisbane, a year after the town became Queensland's fifth municipality. Early Catholic services began in Warwick at the Horse and Jockey Inn in 1854 with Father McGinty, one of only two Catholic priests in Queensland, travelling from Ipswich to celebrate mass. McGinty continued to service the parish from Ipswich until 1862. Dr John Cani, later first bishop of Rockhampton, was the first permanent parish priest in Warwick and during his posting the first St Mary's Roman Catholic Church was constructed, opening in 1865. The order of the Sisters of Mercy arrived in 1874 assuming the role of schooling previously conducted by lay teachers from 1867.

Father James Horan was appointed parish priest of Warwick in 1876. Horan was born at Gormanston, Ireland on 1 January 1846 and studied in Dublin and Versailles before his ordination in January 1868. Shortly after entering the priesthood Horan left Ireland for Queensland, arriving in Brisbane in July. Horan and his brothers Matthew and Andrew – respectively parish priests of Gympie (1868–1923) and Ipswich (1873–1924) – were nephews of James Quinn, first Bishop of Brisbane (1861–1881). From 1868–1872 James Horan performed duties in Rockhampton, Fortitude Valley, Maryborough, Mount Perry and the Peak Downs. In 1872 and 1874 he travelled with Bishop Quinn on Episcopal missions to the north of Queensland as his chaplain. By 1873 he was private secretary to Quinn, a position he held until his arrival in Warwick.

On 2 May 1880 the foundation stone for a presbytery in the grounds of St Mary's Church was laid by Bishop Quinn. The architect for this building was Andrea Stombuco who had previously designed a number of Catholic buildings in the diocese of Brisbane. By August 1881 construction had begun on an elaborate two-storeyed freestone building, featuring towers over the main entrance and the rear wings. However, in the same month Quinn died and work on the presbytery stopped soon after.

Adopting the policy that underpinned the reconstruction of the Church in Ireland, Quinn had actively promoted the expression of Catholicism in Queensland through imposing and expensive ecclesiastical buildings. Quinn's three Horan nephews shared this enthusiasm for large building projects, as illustrated in Gympie by St Patrick's Church (1883–1887), in Ipswich by St Mary's Presbytery (1876), and in Warwick by the scale of the proposed 1880 presbytery, described as "beyond compare" the largest of any dwelling in the town. Quinn's successor, Robert Dunne (Bishop and later Archbishop of Brisbane 1882–1917), opposed such ostentatious displays, which had nearly bankrupted the Brisbane diocese. One of Dunne's early actions as Bishop was to restrict and control building activities throughout the diocese.

In July 1885 Horan purchased land comprising allotments 13 and 14 of Section 46 on the corner of Percy and Palmerin Streets, almost opposite St Mary's Church. In September 1885 a parish meeting convened by Dunne discussed the question of proceeding with the presbytery in the church grounds, on a reduced scale. Although money was pledged and a "large and influential" committee was formed, construction did not resume. While there appear to have been later parish intentions of proceeding with the earlier presbytery, this never eventuated.

The following month, on 10 October 1885 local architects Wallace and Gibson called tenders for the woodwork of a two storey brick dwelling on Horan's property at the corner of Palmerin and Percy streets, Warwick. William Wallace and Richard Gibson were in partnership as builders and contractors from 1876 and worked on Catholic churches at Leyburn and Goondiwindi. By the mid-1880s they were in practice as architects and building surveyors in Warwick with work that included the St George's Masonic Hall (1887) . Stonemason John McCulloch, who had worked on the earlier presbytery, was awarded the contract for the brickwork. McCulloch worked on many prominent religious and civic buildings in Warwick including the Court House (1885), St Mark's Anglican Church (1867–1870), Our Lady of the Assumption Convent (1892–93) and the Warwick Town Hall (1888). The presbytery was built during a pronounced period of prosperity for Warwick and the surrounding agricultural district. The second half of the 1880s was characterised by a wave of development and many of the town's most imposing buildings date from this time.

Horan is likely to have taken up residence by the end of 1887, visiting Brisbane in November to buy furniture for the presbytery after a fund raising concert was held by pupils of St Mary's School. The building has functioned as the Warwick parish presbytery since its construction.

A photo thought to date from the 1890s provides evidence of its appearance soon after its construction. The two-storeyed building, constructed of red brick, was surmounted by an imposing tower of timber over the entrance porch and a hipped iron roof. Iron lacework adorned the verandahs on both floors with timber weatherboards enclosing the corners and rear of the building. A description of the presbytery in 1888 noted the "charming panoramic view" from the tower and the "handsomely furnished" 14 rooms. Although the building included a central tower over the entrance, there is no known documentary evidence to suggest Stombuco's earlier design was appropriated by Wallace and Gibson. While perhaps less grand than the Stombuco design, the presbytery was still a large and highly prominent residence for Warwick, an assertive expression of the Catholic presence in the town and the centrality of the priest to the parish community. Set in spacious grounds on the corner of Warwick's principal thoroughfare, the visual dominance of the presbytery made it a landmark within the townscape.

St Mary's Presbytery fulfilled a range of functions within the parish. As well as the residence for parish priests and their curates, the presbytery was the centre for parish administration. It was used occasionally for wedding ceremonies, provided accommodation for visiting catholic dignitaries and was a social space for hosting important guests. The suitability of Warwick's temperate climate for recuperation saw the presbytery used in this manner by Archbishop Dunne over the summer of 1893–1894. During World War II, soldiers were camped in and around Warwick and chaplains attached to the army used the presbytery as their base.

The Warwick presbytery was one of a number built in Catholic parishes throughout Queensland in the last quarter of the nineteenth century. These varied from modest timber houses in small settlements to more impressive dwellings located in important regional towns with larger catholic communities. Many nineteenth century presbyteries were replaced during the extensive building programme that characterised the reign of Archbishop James Duhig (1917–1965). Presbyteries dating from the 1880s that continue to function as residences for Catholic priests in Queensland are uncommon.

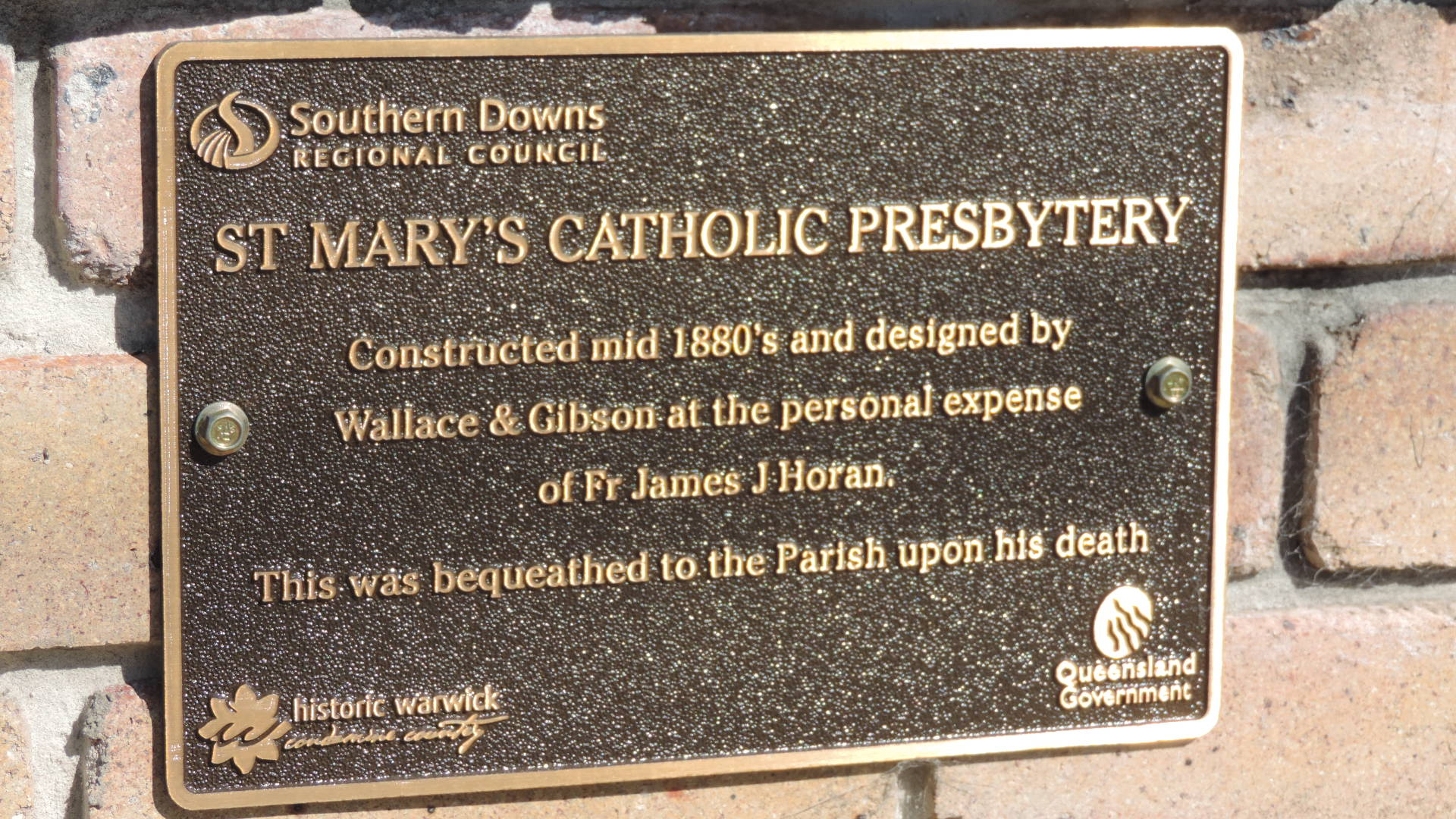
Plaque at St Mary's Presbytery, 2015

James Horan died at the presbytery in May 1905. By the end of his time in Warwick he had been instrumental in the construction of Our Lady of the Assumption Convent, St Mary's School, extensions to St Mary's Church and timber churches in Emu Vale, Clifton, Allora and Goondiwindi. Among Queensland priests, Horan was Archbishop Dunne's key supporter in promoting Irish catholic rural settlement. The increase in Warwick's catholic population from 11.4 percent in 1881 to 32.1 percent in 1911 illustrates his effectiveness in this regard. In accordance with Horan's will, the presbytery was sold by the estate executors to Archbishop Dunne, Father Andrew Horan and Father James Benedict Breen on behalf of Warwick parish for £3,235, with the proceeds of the sale forwarded to the construction of the Christian Brother's College that opened in Warwick in 1912. In 1951 title of the presbytery was transferred to the Roman Catholic Diocese of Toowoomba.

Monsignor Michael Potter, who was posted as a curate to Warwick in 1891, was appointed parish priest after Horan's death. Potter continued the enthusiasm for parish building with major projects including the second St Mary's Church (1926) and additions to the convent. Potter resided in the presbytery for over fifty years until his death in 1944.

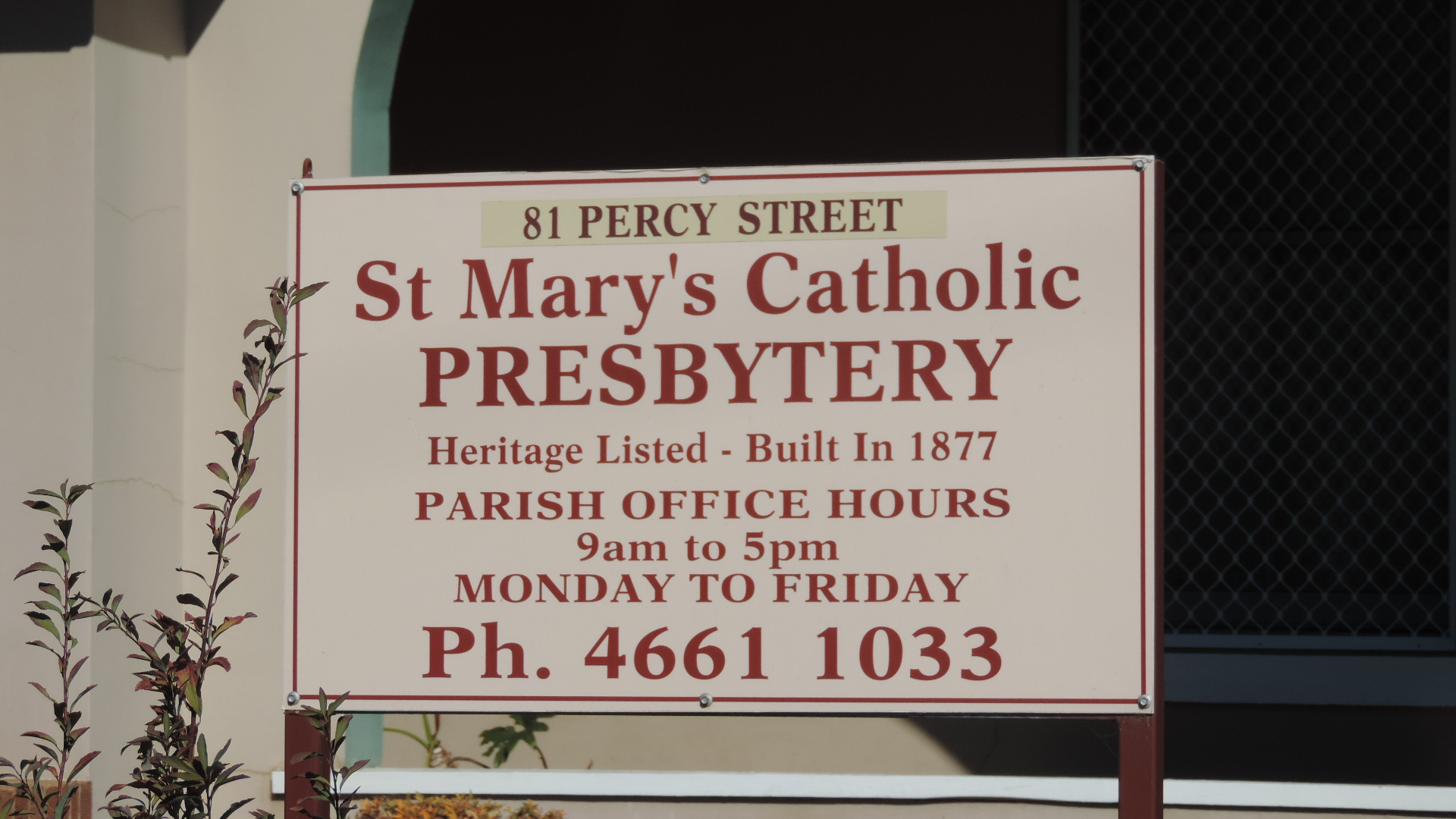
Sign outside St Mary's Presbytery, Warwick, 2015

In 1948 Father Michael Mahon was appointed administrator to the parish of Warwick. During the early years of Mahon's administration a substantial renovation program was undertaken on the presbytery. The brickwork of the presbytery was rendered and painted white. The decorative iron railings on the verandahs were replaced with timber weatherboards on the first floor and solid arches on the ground floor. At the rear of the building a single-storeyed timber kitchen/dining area and an office space were added. The rear ends of the verandah on the eastern side of the presbytery were enclosed to provide extra accommodation on the first floor and a sitting room on the ground floor. Basins were installed in the first floor bedrooms and a garage was built on the eastern side of the building. A hay shed at the rear of the property was replaced by a bowling green and clubhouse. More recently, a set of units have been built adjacent to the bowling green. Both the units and the bowling green are privately leased. An additional concrete block garage with a coloured metal sheeting roof has also been added behind the presbytery.

In the second half of the twentieth century, a succession of priests resided at the presbytery. St Mary's Presbytery continues to function as the dwelling of Warwick's resident priest and as administrative centre for the parish.

== Description ==
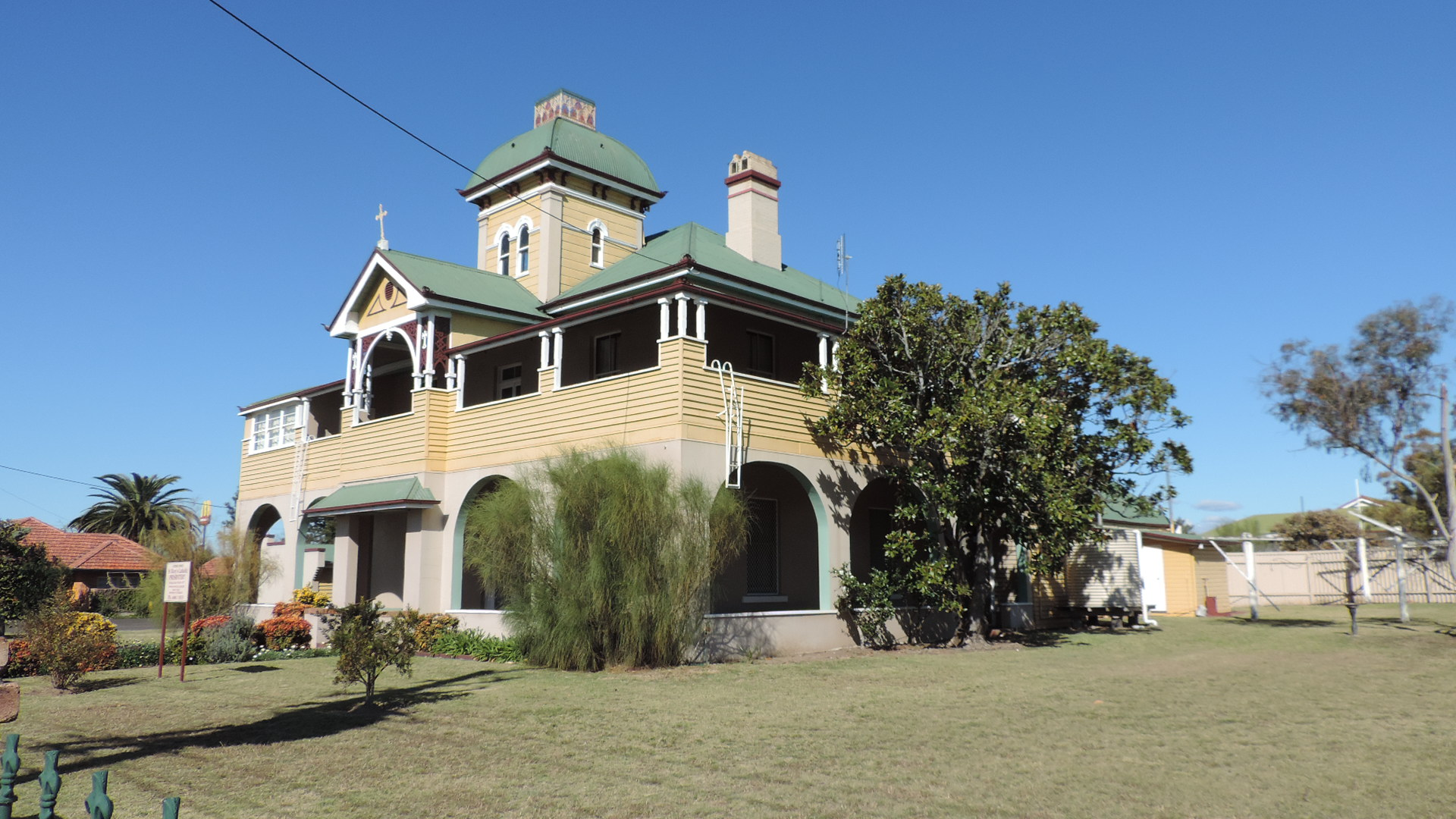
St Mary's Presbytery, viewed from Palmerin and Percy Streets, 2015

Standing to the south edge of the CBD of Warwick on the northern half of a one hectare block bounded by Palmerin and Percy Streets and Stewart Avenue, St Mary's Presbytery is a commanding presence in the neighbourhood. The presbytery is an integral part of the Warwick Catholic parish precinct which is spread across two adjacent town blocks and includes an imposing sandstone church, an earlier sandstone church now used as a parish hall, primary school and playgrounds, tennis and squash courts, a bowls club and residential apartments. The first floor verandah and belvedere of the presbytery afford sweeping views of Warwick and the surrounding district. There is a white painted timber fence across the block to the south of the presbytery separating it from the Southern Cross Bowls Club facilities (bowling green and associated structures) and lowset residential apartments which are not included in the heritage listing.

A two-storey residence with the ground floor verandahs standing on low brick stumps, the presbytery is constructed of red brick with the exterior now rendered and painted. (A portion of the face brick exterior remains behind hinged doors to the lower wall of the upper east verandah.) The building has verandahs to three sides on each floor and is distinguished by a handsome belvedere which crowns the main pyramidal roof. Curved roofs shelter the belvedere and verandahs. All roofs are clad in corrugated metal sheeting, the corners decorated with acroteria. Two painted brick chimneys rise through the main roof.

Addressing Percy Street, the front elevation is symmetrical about a projecting gable-roofed porch to the upper storey below which a small hipped roof shelters the ground floor main entrance steps. The projecting porch is crowned by a metal cross to the apex of the gable and is distinguished by decorative fretwork (incorporating a cross motif) to the arches and infill to the paired chamfered timber posts.

The upper verandah is punctuated by pairs of chamfered timber posts carrying plain square timber capitals and the solid balustrades are clad with weatherboards and lined with vertical tongue and groove boards. Later rendered masonry arches frame the ground floor verandahs and detract from the otherwise elegant understated presentation of the building. The verandahs to the east on both levels are enclosed with banks of sash windows to the upper storey and banks of glass louvres to the ground floor. The verandah ceilings are lined with ripple iron and the ceiling to the projecting porch with timber boarding. The rear elevation is clad with weatherboards.

Clad with chamferboards, the belvedere is defined by projecting pilasters to the corners which carry a moulded timber cornice continuous around all elevations below sets of decorative paired eaves brackets. Narrow round sash windows punctuate the east and west elevations matching a pair of round sash windows to the north. The bullnosed roof is crowned by a small open viewing platform screened with a low decorative cast iron surround & this is all that remains of the decorative cast iron that earlier embellished the building.

The interior is characterised by an elegant austerity with commodious rooms, decorative metal fireplace grates within marble or timber mantelpieces and quality moulded panel doors and etched glass fanlights. The front and rear doors are flanked by etched glass side lights. Door and window joinery retains much of its original hardware. The main and attic staircases have fine turned balusters and newel posts.

The plan is organised around a central hall which travels through to the rear enclosed verandah and later extension which houses the kitchen/dining and utility spaces and parish office. The hall accommodates a timber dogleg staircase with a half landing. A large double hung sash window lights the stairwell. A reception room and two offices open off the hall on the ground floor and four bedrooms and an enclosed rear verandah work off the hall at the upper level. A narrow rectangular cement rendered brick cellar sits below the hall and is accessed through a timber door under the main stair.

The reception room is a generous space running the length of the east side of the ground floor. Two fine cedar doors with etched glass fanlights open into this room from the hall. The room has a plain plaster ceiling and moulded cornice, a later wallpaper finish to frieze height on the plastered walls and a fireplace with a marble mantelpiece and decorative metal grate. A set of French windows open onto the enclosed verandah to the east which now functions as a small conservatory. Two commodious offices are accommodated to the west side of the ground floor and fireplaces in each room share the double-sided chimney. These rooms have plain plastered walls and timber lined ceilings and each has a double hung sash window to the west verandah. The front office has an additional window to the north verandah.

There are four spacious bedrooms to the upper floor. Those on the west accommodate fireplaces that share the double-sided chimney and have plain plastered ceilings and double hung sash windows to the verandahs. Those on the east side have timber boarded lining to the ceilings and double hung sash windows to the enclosed verandah which now functions as a sleepout. The enclosed rear verandah accommodates a dormitory style bedroom to the southwest end, a utility space to the middle and a line of bathrooms working off a narrow corridor to the east side. A pair of wide French windows open from the upper hall onto the north verandah.

A narrow timber stair ascends from the north of the upper hall to the attic space accessed through a hinged hatch timber door. The attic is lined with painted horizontal beaded tongue-and-groove boards and houses a small water tank. An unpainted timber door to the north connects to the belvedere viewing room, which is lined with painted horizontal beaded tongue-and-groove boards and houses an unpainted timber cupboard and low bench. A steep timber step ladder rises to the roof space of the belvedere, from which a shorter narrow step ladder ascends to the small open viewing platform crowning the belvedere. A removable hatch gives access to the platform.

The presbytery stands in a large yard with a range of shrubs and trees screening the front elevation and lining the front path to the main entrance. The large open grassed yard to the west has a scatter of shrubs along the southern fence line. A four car concrete block garage and a small low-set timber shed stand along this fence line to the southeast of the house and a timber four car garage stands directly east. A recent green powdered coated moulded aluminium fence with pale face brick piers runs to the north and west boundaries. These garages, shed, plantings and fence are not considered to be of cultural heritage significance and are not included in the heritage listing.

== Heritage listing ==
St Mary's Presbytery was listed on the Queensland Heritage Register on 31 July 2008 having satisfied the following criteria.

The place is important in demonstrating the evolution or pattern of Queensland's history.

St Mary's Presbytery, erected in 1885–1887, is important in demonstrating the growth and prosperity of Warwick, an important regional centre for the Southern Darling Downs, during the prosperous second half of the 1880s when many of the town's most prominent buildings were constructed.

St Mary's Presbytery is important in demonstrating the pattern of development of the Roman Catholic Church in Queensland. The presbytery illustrates the consolidation and regional importance of the parish of Warwick in the late nineteenth century following its establishment in 1862.

The place demonstrates rare, uncommon or endangered aspects of Queensland's cultural heritage.

St Mary's Presbytery is important as an uncommon example of a Queensland presbytery from the 1880s that has maintained its use as a dwelling for a parish priest. Most presbyteries built in the colonial era in Queensland were replaced, reused or sold during the twentieth century.

The place is important in demonstrating the principal characteristics of a particular class of cultural places.

St Mary's Presbytery is important as a fine example of a large nineteenth-century presbytery in an important regional Queensland town. The building occupies a prominent position in the town, in close proximity to the parish church. The scale of the building, its large verandahs and multiple rooms demonstrate the presbytery's primary function of accommodating parish priests and curates, its capacity to provide hospitality for guests and ability to operate as administrative centre for the parish. Externally the scale of the building and its tower are designed to impress and to reinforce the Catholic presence in Warwick, while the plain internal finishes are illustrative of the more austere existence associated with religious vocations.

The place is important because of its aesthetic significance.

St Mary's Presbytery is important because of its aesthetic significance. Set in spacious grounds on a corner along Warwick's principal thoroughfare, the visual dominance of the presbytery, enhanced by its imposing central tower, makes the presbytery a landmark within the townscape. The presbytery makes a strong contribution to a precinct of catholic buildings extending along Palmerin Street, an assertive expression of the Catholic presence in Warwick and the centrality of the priest to the parish community.

The place has a strong or special association with a particular community or cultural group for social, cultural or spiritual reasons.

St Mary's Presbytery has a special association with the Catholic community of Warwick, having been the residence of successive priests and curates of the Warwick parish since 1887.

The place has a special association with the life or work of a particular person, group or organisation of importance in Queensland's history.

St Mary's Presbytery has a special association with Father James Horan, parish priest of Warwick from 1874–1905, for whom the building was erected. Horan was an important figure in the early development of the Catholic church in Queensland and influenced the strong pattern of Irish land settlement in the Warwick district.
