= Our Lady of the Assumption Convent, Warwick =

Our Lady of Assumption Convent, Warwick
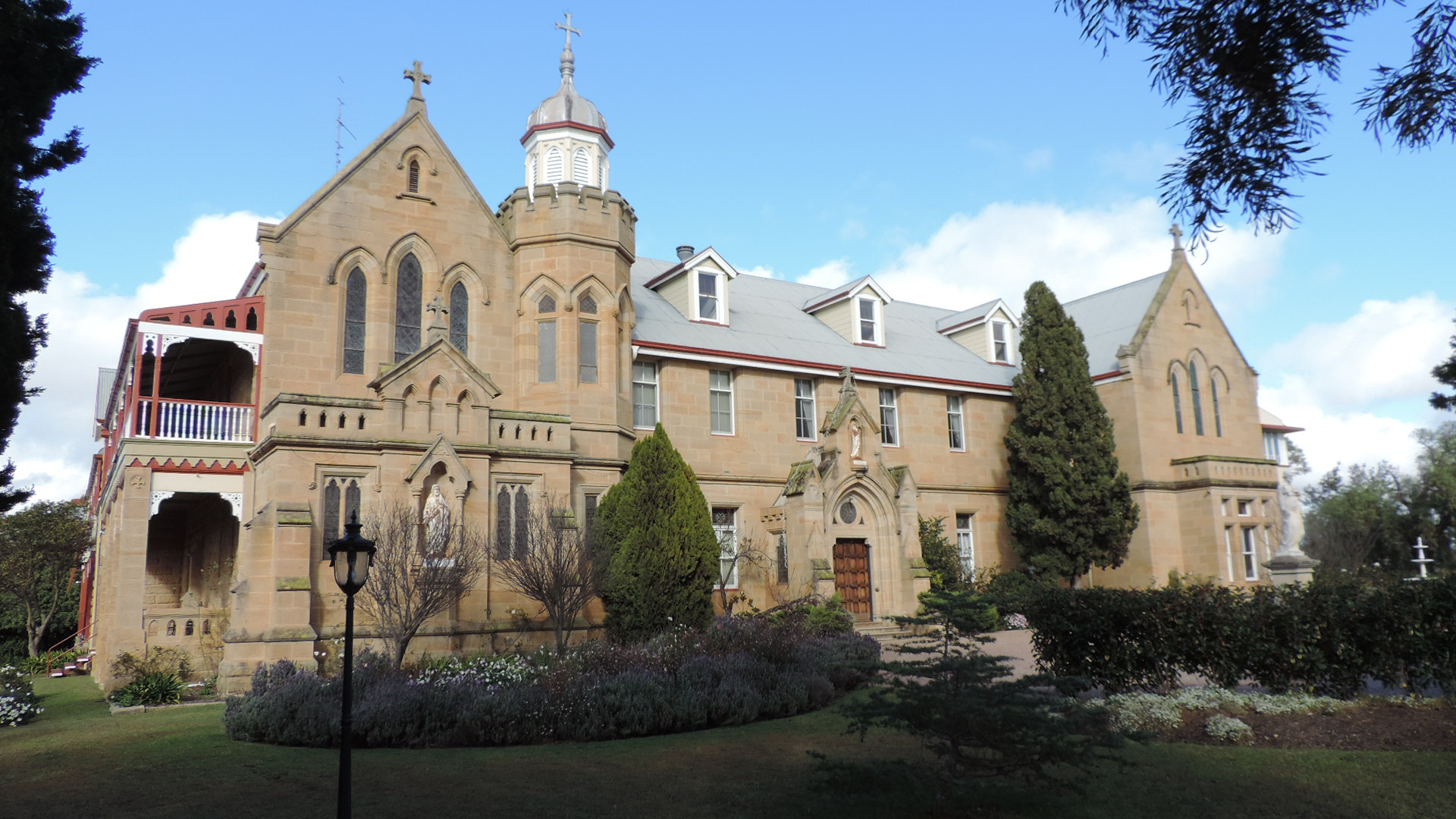
- Our Lady of Assumption Convent, 2015

- Location within Queensland Location within Australia
- 28.2254°S 152.0269°E
- Location: 8 Locke Street, Warwick, Southern Downs Region, Queensland, Australia

History
- Design period: 1870s–1890s (late 19th century)
- Built: 1891–1914

Site notes
- Architect: Simkin & Ibler
- Architectural style: Gothic

Queensland Heritage Register
- Official name: Cloisters, Assumption College, Our Lady of Assumption Convent, Sophia College
- Type: state heritage (built)
- Designated: 21 October 1992
- Reference no.: 600953
- Significant period: 1890s, 1940s (historical); 1890s, 1900s, 1910s (fabric); 1890s–1980s (social)
- Significant components: stained glass window/s, convent/nunnery, views to, tower
- Builders: Alexander Mayes

Our Lady of Assumption Convent is a heritage-listed former Roman Catholic convent at 8 Locke Street, Warwick, Southern Downs Region, Queensland, Australia. It was designed by Simkin & Ibler and built from 1891 to 1914. It is also known as Assumption College, Cloisters, and Sophia College. It was added to the Queensland Heritage Register on 21 October 1992.

== History ==
The former Our Lady of the Assumption Convent was built in 1892–3 as the second convent of the Sisters of Mercy in Warwick. Additions in 1904 completed the original plans of Brisbane architects, Simkin and Ibler.

The township of Warwick was declared a municipality in 1861, and prior to this was a developed centre of Darling Downs agriculture with the first land sales in 1850, and the establishment of the Horse and Jockey Inn in December 1848. In 1854 Roman Catholic services, like many other religious and social gatherings held in Warwick, began in the Horse and Jockey Inn. Father McGinty, one of only two Catholic priests in Queensland, travelled from Ipswich to celebrate mass. In 1862, Warwick became a separate parish of the church and Dr John Cani was appointed as the parish priest.

An order of the Sisters of Mercy was founded in Warwick on 29 October 1874, thirteen years after the Sisters first arrived in Queensland, from Ireland with Bishop James Quinn. The Warwick community was the fifth branch house that the Sisters of Mercy established in Queensland, from the mother house at All Hallows' in Brisbane. The Sisters acquired their first convent in a brick cottage at the corner of Albion and Percy Streets, Warwick, and immediately took over the running of the Catholic school, operated by the Missus O'Mara since 1867.

The Sisters remained in the cottage for nineteen years when, after many years of planning, their new convent was ready for occupation in 1893. The site, on Locke Street, was chosen by Bishop Quinn and purchased by the Sisters on 27 August 1877 from Edward Collins, who acquired the original Deed of Grant on 1 February 1854.

Several plans were submitted for consideration and those of Brisbane architects, Simkin and Ibler were chosen. When tenders were obtained for these plans: a two storeyed sandstone building consisting of a central bay flanked by transverse wings, it was too expensive to build, and, rather than alter the plan, the central bay and eastern, chapel wing were constructed with provision allowed for completion at a later date. The early drawing of the convent shows the building as a mirror image of how it now stands, which the chapel wings and tower to the left of the entrance porch rather than to the right.

In the early 1890s, Simkin and Ibler were responsible for the design of several other buildings constructed for the Catholic Church in Queensland, notably "Darra", a residence on Ann Street opposite All Hallows' Convent, for Bishop Quinn, who died before its completion in 1891; St Stephen's School for Girls in Charlotte Street, Brisbane (1892); and St Mary's Church on Peel Street, South Brisbane (1892–93). George Simkin and John Ibler, who comprised the partnership, practised together from 1889 until 1894 and many of their buildings are notable examples of Victorian eclecticism and flamboyance.

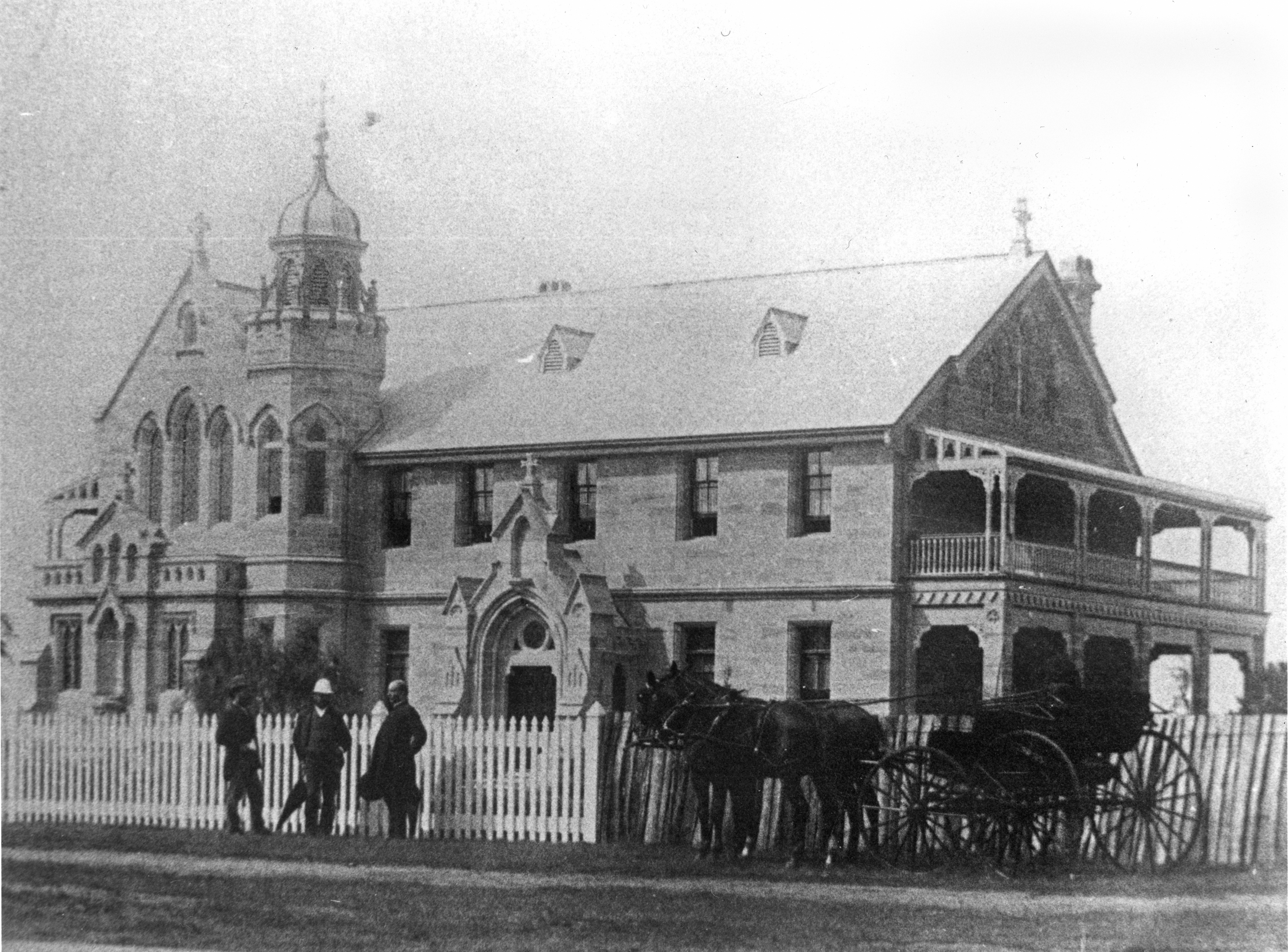
Our Lady of the Assumption Convent, circa 1895

The foundation stone of the convent was laid in August 1891 by Archbishop Robert Dunne, who also performed the opening ceremony two years later on 11 March 1893. These occasions were gala events in Warwick, and much of the cost of the building was defrayed by subscriptions raised at the ceremonies.

The building was described as a "magnificent edifice...commanding a beautiful view of the town and district". A timber kitchen wing, which was replaced by a 1914 wing, was constructed to the south east of the building which comprised the kitchen, a boarder's refectory, laundry and servant's rooms. Water tanks were provided near the laundry and also above the attic, in the space between the ceiling and the roof of the convent.

The building contract was undertaken by Alexander Mayes of Toowoomba, at a cost of £4500. The stonework was sub-contracted to John McCulloch of Warwick, and the painting and decorating work was undertaken by P Cameron of Fitzroy Street, Warwick.

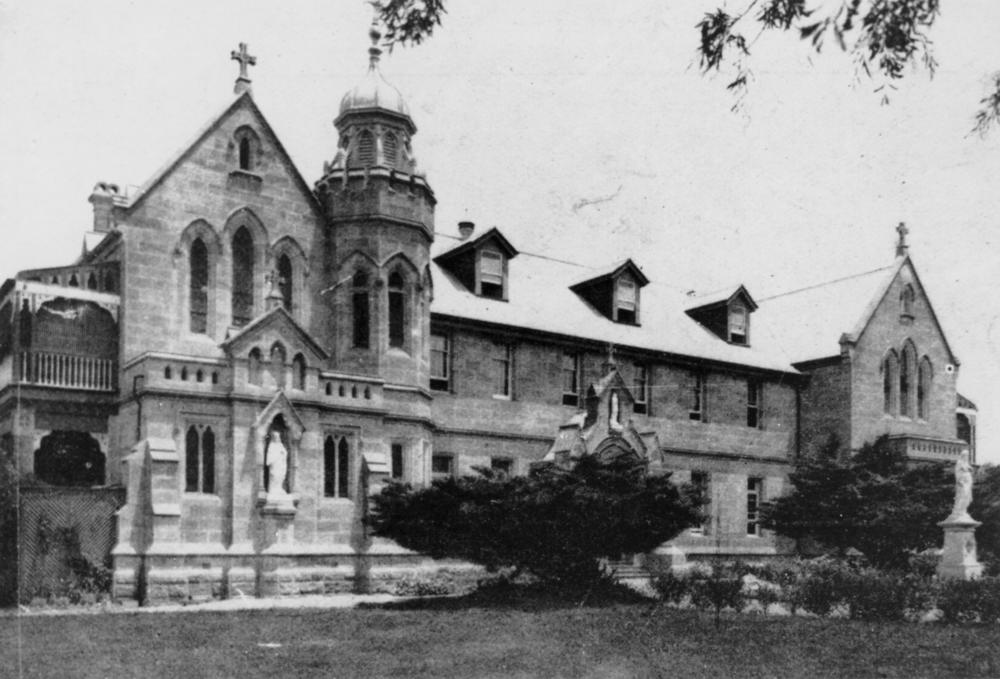
Our Lady of Assumption Convent, 1933

The second stage, being the western wing of the building was constructed by E. Valley, in 1904 at a cost of £3215. This saw the completion of the original plan, with reception rooms on the ground floor and a large dormitory space above.

In 1914 an extension of the western wing was added to designs of local architects, Dornbusch and Connolly, who designed the second St Mary's Church in Warwick (1929). Tenders for this work were called in December 1912. The painting and decorating was by Donald Crawford in this extension. Sandstone used for this extension was from Campbell's Gully. This work was undertaken to meet the newly introduced State High School provisions (1912), which required extra subjects and, therefore, extra rooms, to allow the students to graduate. It is thought that dormer windows were added to the roof of the building, providing natural lighting to the attic at about this time.

During the Second World War, boarders from All Hallows' Convent in Brisbane were transferred to the convent in Warwick, which required the closing in of the western verandah.

The Sisters of Mercy withdrew from Warwick in 1988, when lay Catholics in the town retained Assumption College as a campus for tertiary education. The convent was renamed "Sophia", a Greek word for wisdom, and opened on 17 February 1989.

The building was sold in 1994 and has become a reception centre. This required the addition of a toilet block to the west of the building, and a substantial internal renovation. In 2015, it was known as "Abbey of the Roses", providing a wedding venue and accommodation.

== Description ==
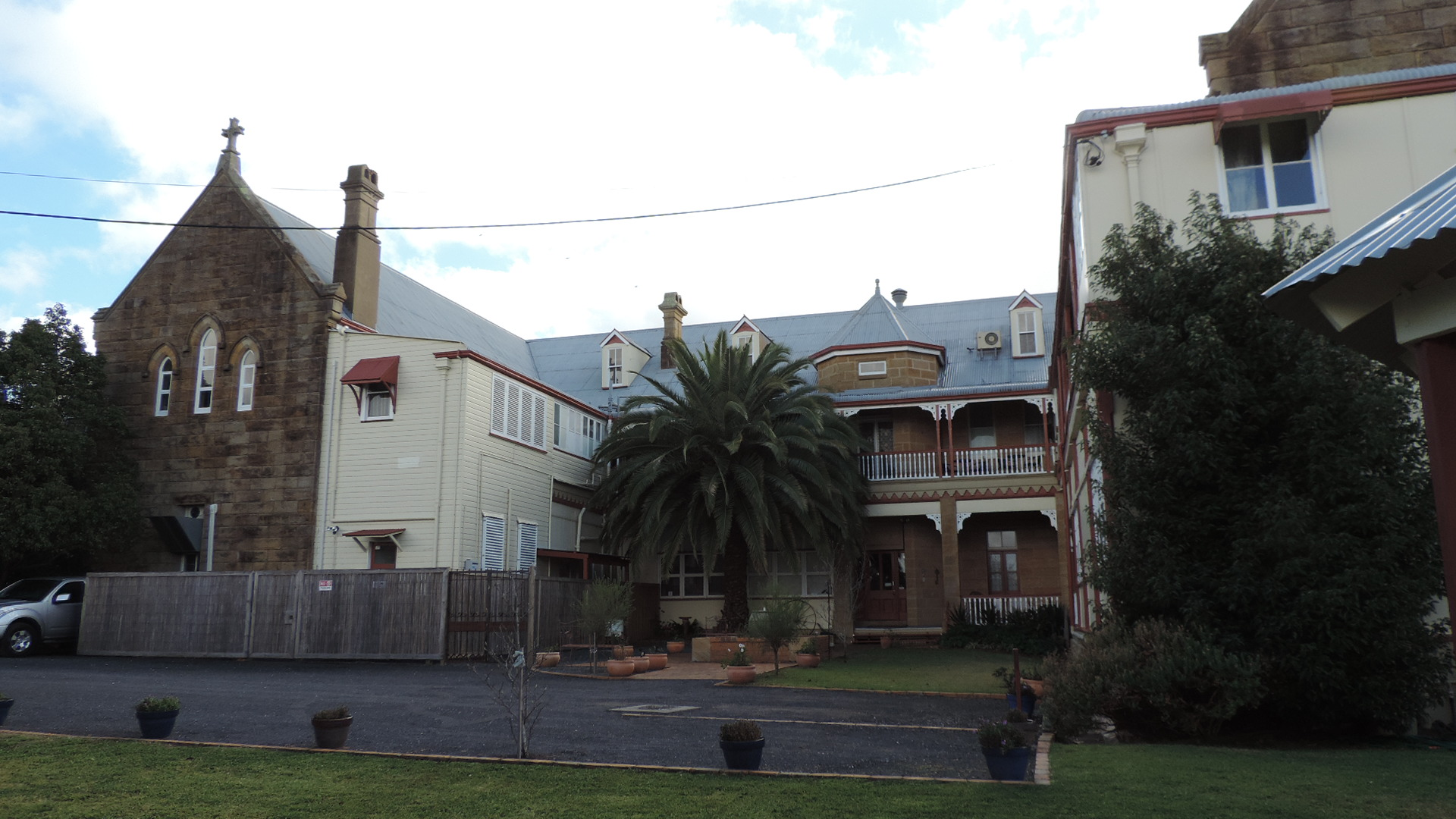
View of rear courtyard, 2015

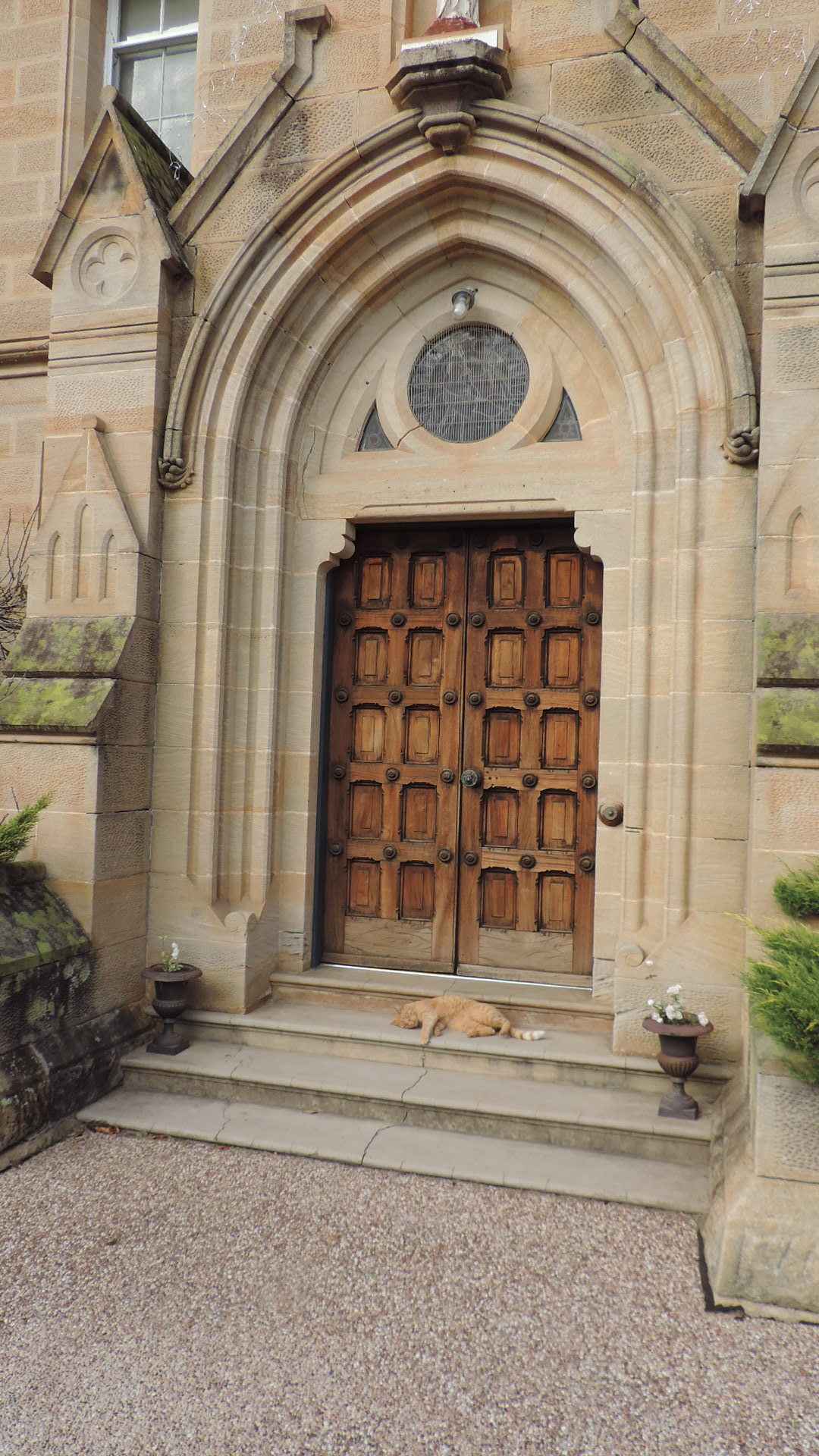
Entrance porch, 2015

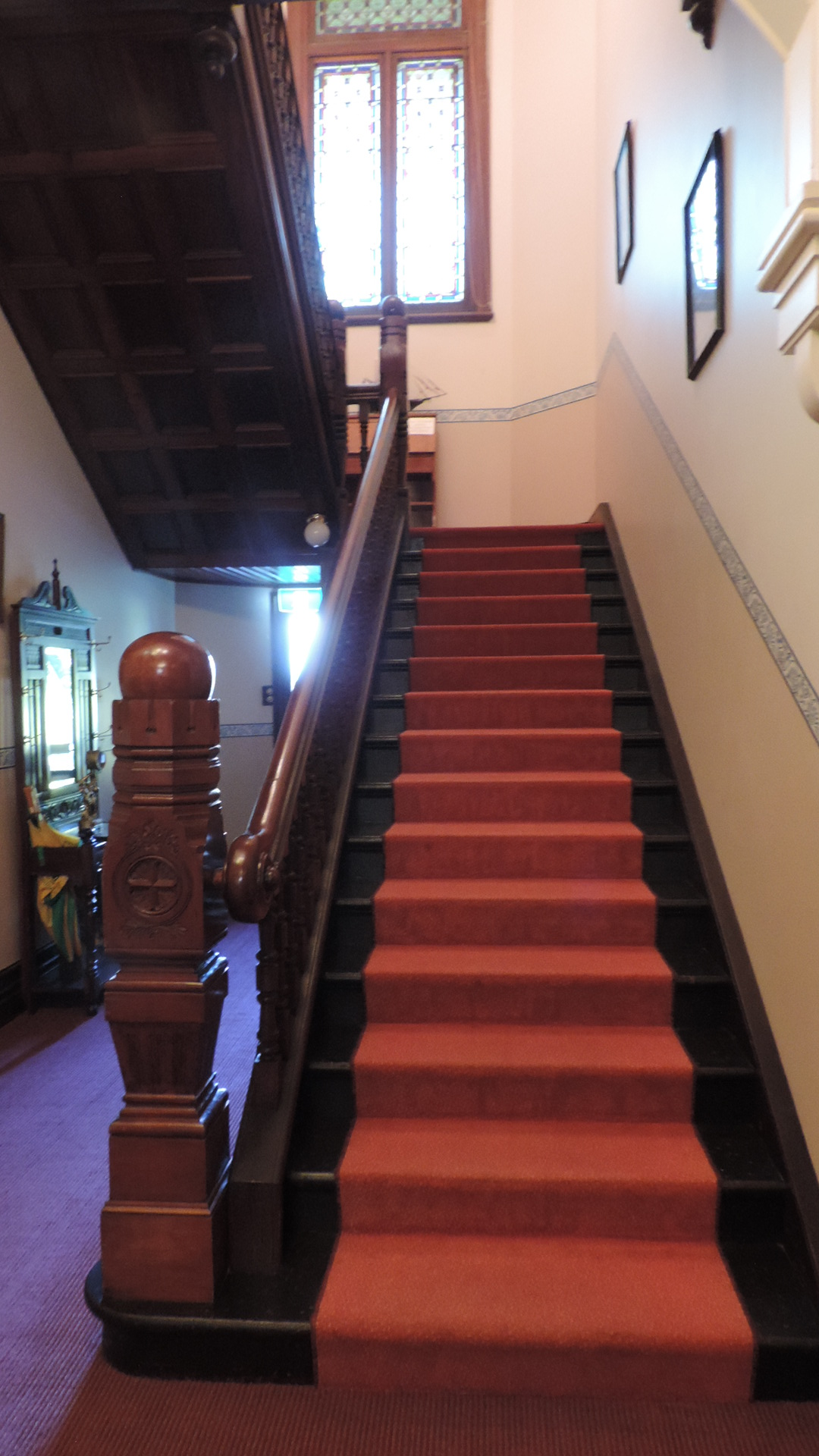
Internal staircase, 2015

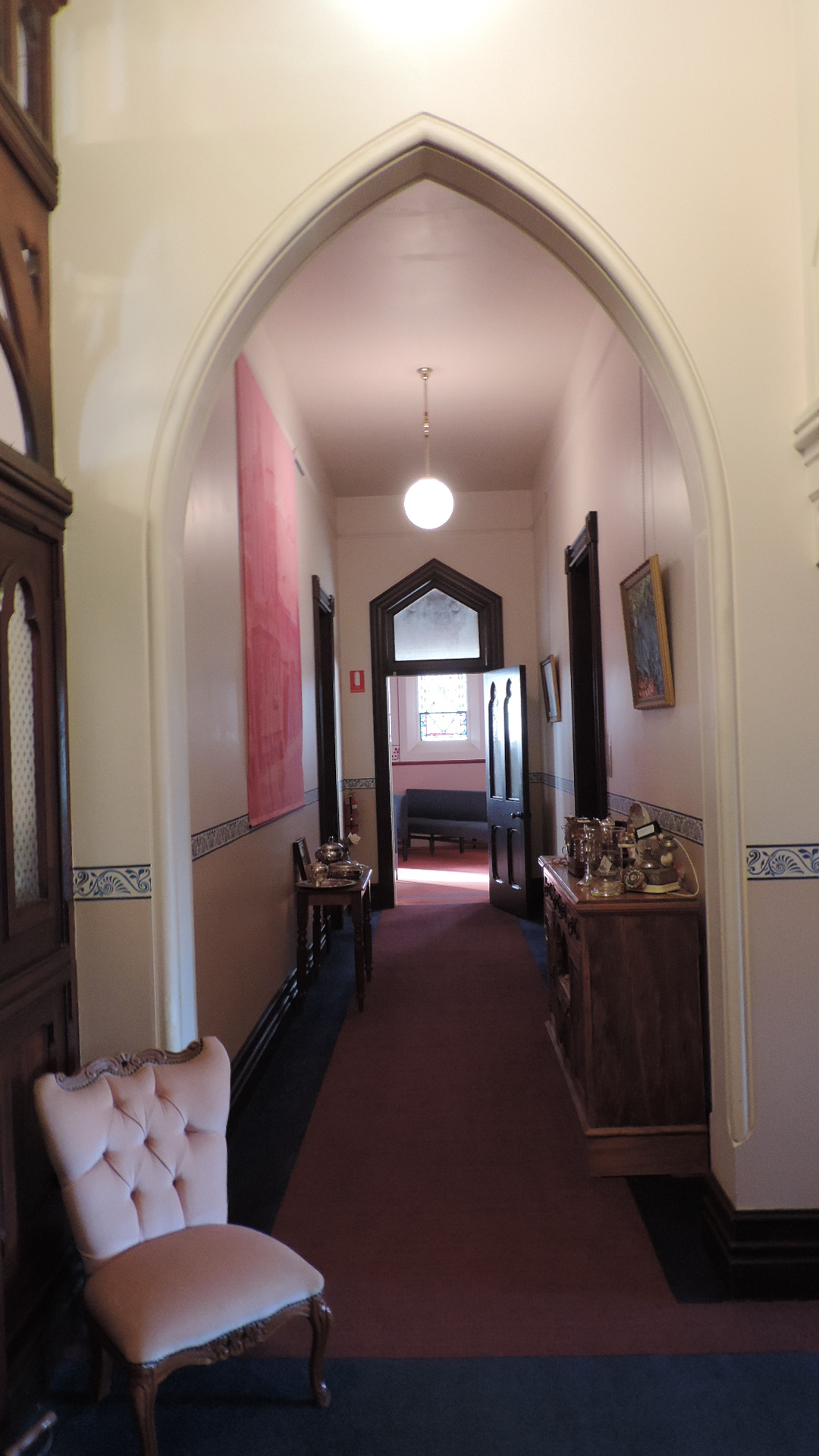
Central corridor, 2015

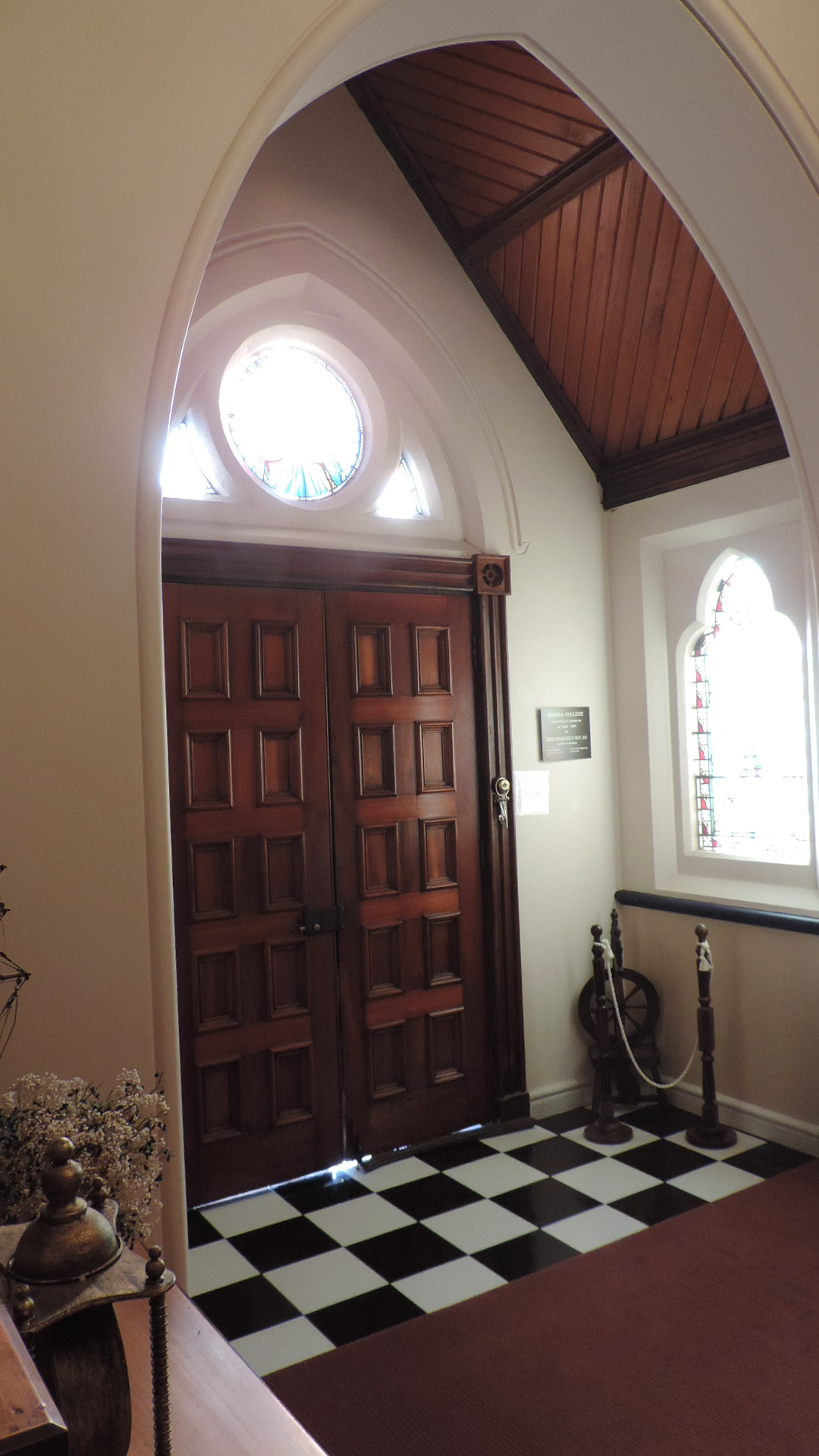
Entrance vestibule, 2015

The former Our Lady of Assumption Convent is a substantial two storeyed sandstone building prominently located on Locke Street, Warwick. The building consists of a central entrance bay running east–west, flanked by transverse wings which extend to the south forming a three sided courtyard at the rear of the building. Two storeyed verandahs are found on all elevations except the principal entrance facade.

The building is constructed of sandstone from Mitchell's Quarry, and is generally coursed ashlar on the northern entrance facade, and coursed rock faced on the other elevations. All stone detailing, including tracery and window surrounds, mouldings, carvings, copings, chimneys is of smooth faced sandstone.

The corrugated iron roof is generally hipped, and gabled over the transverse wings. Three dormer windows project through the roof on the northern and southern faces of the central wing of the building.

The entrance facade, addressing Locke Street, consists of the central bay, the gabled ends of the transverse wings, a prominent entrance porch and the bell tower, attached to the building at the intersection of the central bay and the eastern, chapel, wing. The entrance porch, located, not centrally, but slightly closer to the east of the building, is a pointed arched opening flanked by gabled pinnacles and all surmounted by a pedimented block, in which is a statue niche.

The octagonal sandstone and timber tower, to the east of the entrance porch, extends through two levels of the building and is surmounted by a belfry. Openings to the ground floor level of the tower are elongated rectangular windows filled with stained glass, and to the upper level are triangular headed windows, with similarly shaped hood mouldings joined at the intersections of the faces of the tower. The first floor of the tower is expressed with a string course, above which is a moulded course which is repeated above the first floor windows. A battlemented edge coping surrounds the top of the sandstone section of the tower. Surmounting this, is a timber extension recessed from the edge of the sandstone section and with timber louvred trefoil lancet openings. The tower is roofed with a lead sheeted onion dome, with expressed ribs and surmounted by a Latin cross made from metal.

The gabled eastern end of the entrance facade, projects past the adjacent tower only at the ground floor level. This projection has a central pedimented bay in which there is a statue niche. Flanking this are paired lancet windows of stained glass, and on the outside edges of the wing is angle buttressing. The projecting section has a parapet detail of trefoil arches between sandstone string courses, concealing a hipped roof. The first floor of this elevation of the wing features a tripartite lancet tapering window arrangement, above which is a smaller lancet opening. The apex of the gable, which has a moulded coping stepped at the gable corners, is surmounted by a carved sandstone Latin cross.

The western end of this southern facade, is similar, but considerably less decorative than the eastern, chapel, wing. A centrally located bay window, with similar parapet detailing to that on the projecting section of the eastern wing, is found on the first floor. This bay window is rectangular in plan, with three glazed openings, a wider central four panel sash, flanked by sidelights. These openings have corresponding transom lights. The first floor tripartite window arrangement and high level lancet, as well as the gable edge detailing, found on the eastern wing of the building, are also featured on this western gabled section.

The double storeyed verandah, which dominates the western facade of the building, is of stone construction on the ground floor and timber construction above. Vermiculated stone columns have carved Greek Cross motifs in their capitals. Stone balustrading, with a trefoil arched cutout detail infills the southern return of the verandah, and cast iron balustrading and timber lattice infill panels are used elsewhere. The first floor verandah is infilled with fibrous cement sheeting to balustrade level, above which are side opening arctic glass casement windows in bays of six.

The rear of the building, to the north, comprises a three sided courtyard bound by the transverse wings and the rear of the central bay, all dominated by two storeyed verandahs. The rear of the central bay features a hipped roofed octagonal section, expressing the internal principal stair. The verandahs to this section are stone on the ground level and timber above, where all other verandahs, some of which have been infilled with fibrous cement sheeting and glazing, are timber framed. The gabled elevations of the transverse wings are stone and have tripartite lancet windows, and similar gable edge detailing to that found on the front of the building.

The eastern elevation of the building, again dominated by two storeyed verandahs, has a centrally located projecting gabled bay, expressing an internal stair hall. Two pointed arched windows are found on the first floor of this and a door opening on ground level, covered by a recent walkway into adjacent schoolgrounds. To the northern (rear) of this bay the verandahs are timber framed with simple turned balusters, stop chamfered columns and fretwork brackets and infill mouldings. To the south of the central bay the verandah is stone on the ground level and timber above. The verandah fascia, at first floor level, is lined with a decorative timber panel with trefoil arched cutouts.

Internally, the building is arranged around a central corridor running east–west through both levels of the building from which smaller rooms are accessed, with major rooms in the transverse wings. Generally, the lower floor has plastered ceilings and walls, and the upper floor has beaded timber board ceilings and walls. To the rear of the chapel, in the eastern wing, the 1914 addition is generally of timber internally.

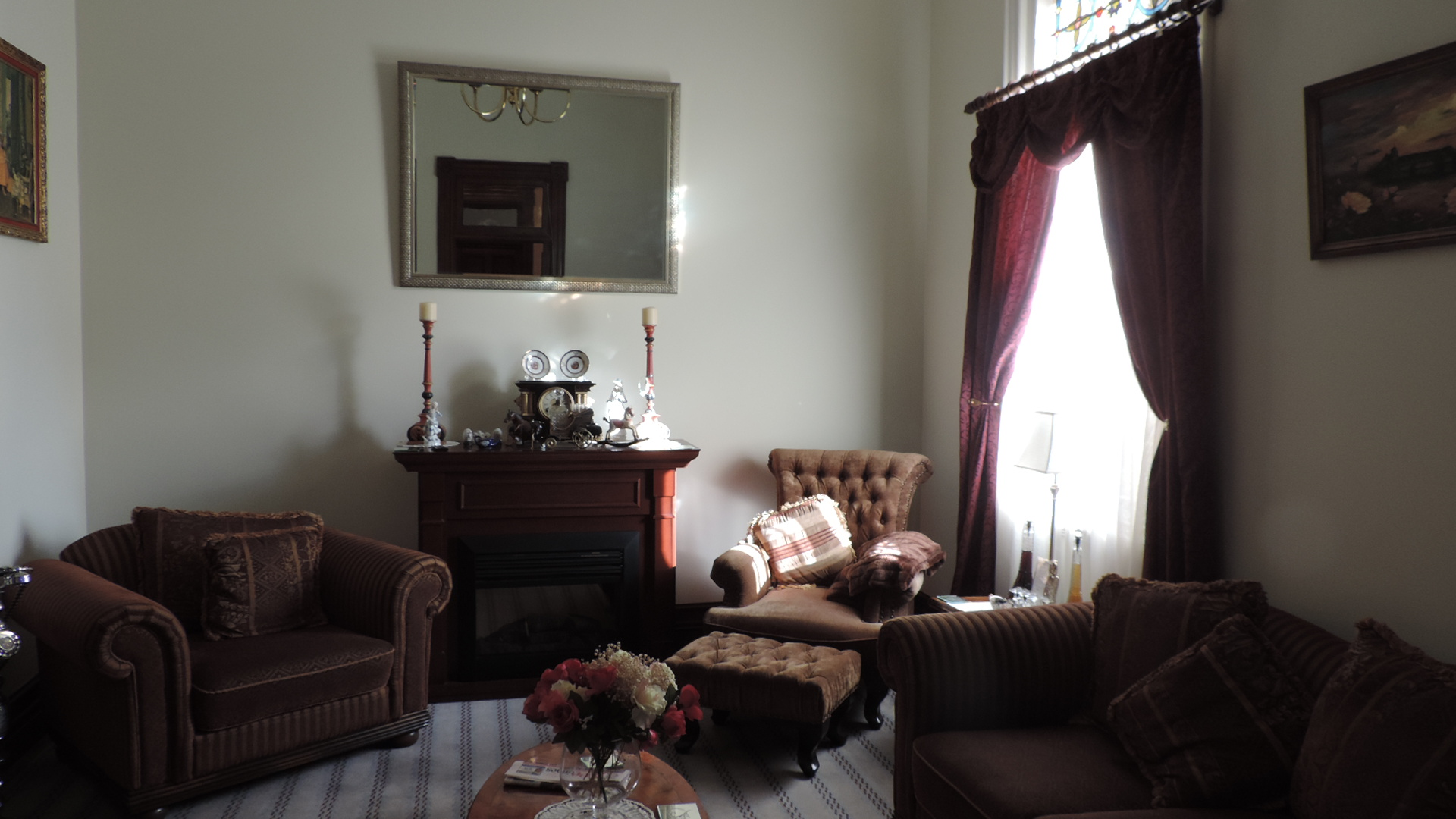
Front room used as a lounge, 2015

The principal entrance, through the porch on the southern facade, features a double ten panelled and moulded high-quality timber door, through which the entrance vestibule, in the porch is reached. This small area features two elaborate stained glass windows of grisaille glass where the panels are entirely of ornament, in trefoil arched openings, and a diagonally boarded stained timber raked ceiling. Through a pointed arched opening is an entrance hall with ribbed cedar wainscotting. Two elaborate timber doorways, with moulded architraves surmounted by entablatures, have four panelled doors with transom lights above, and access former reception and music rooms. These front rooms have two vertical sash windows each, with stained glass transom lights above.

Separating the entrance hall from the central corridor is a fine cedar screen, with three tiers of trefoil arched openings, some of which are glazed with embossed glass panels. Beyond the screen and separated from the corridor by a round plaster arch, supported on Norman-inspired corbels, is the principal half turn closed well stair of cedar, with a large carved newel post and turned blasters. The underside of the stair is lined with coffered cedar panels. A stained glass staircase window, of two vertical panels and a transom light, provides natural lighting. Two pointed arched openings in the corridor, flanking the stair, separate this principal entrance area from the remainder of the ground floor.

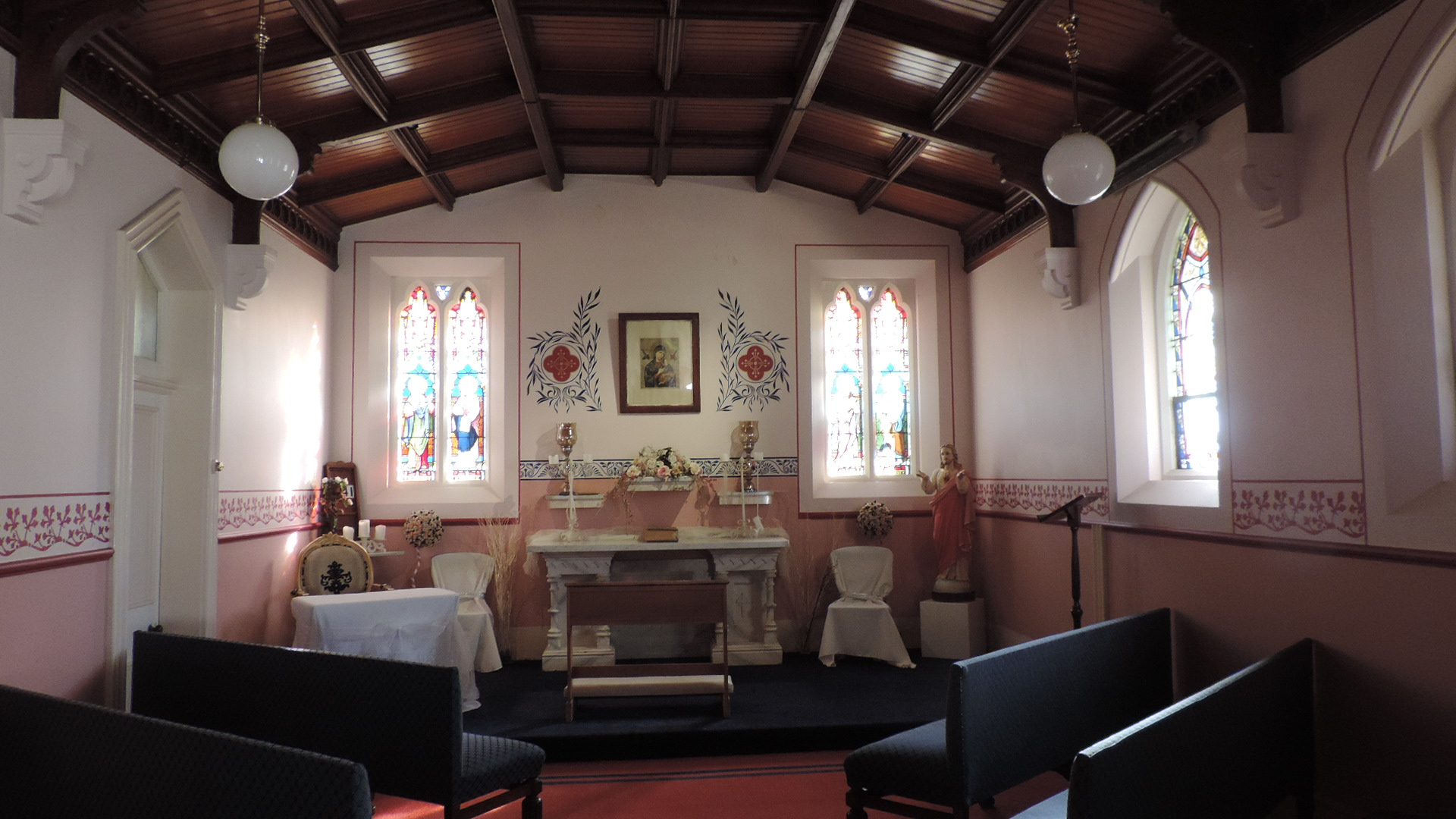
Chapel, 2015

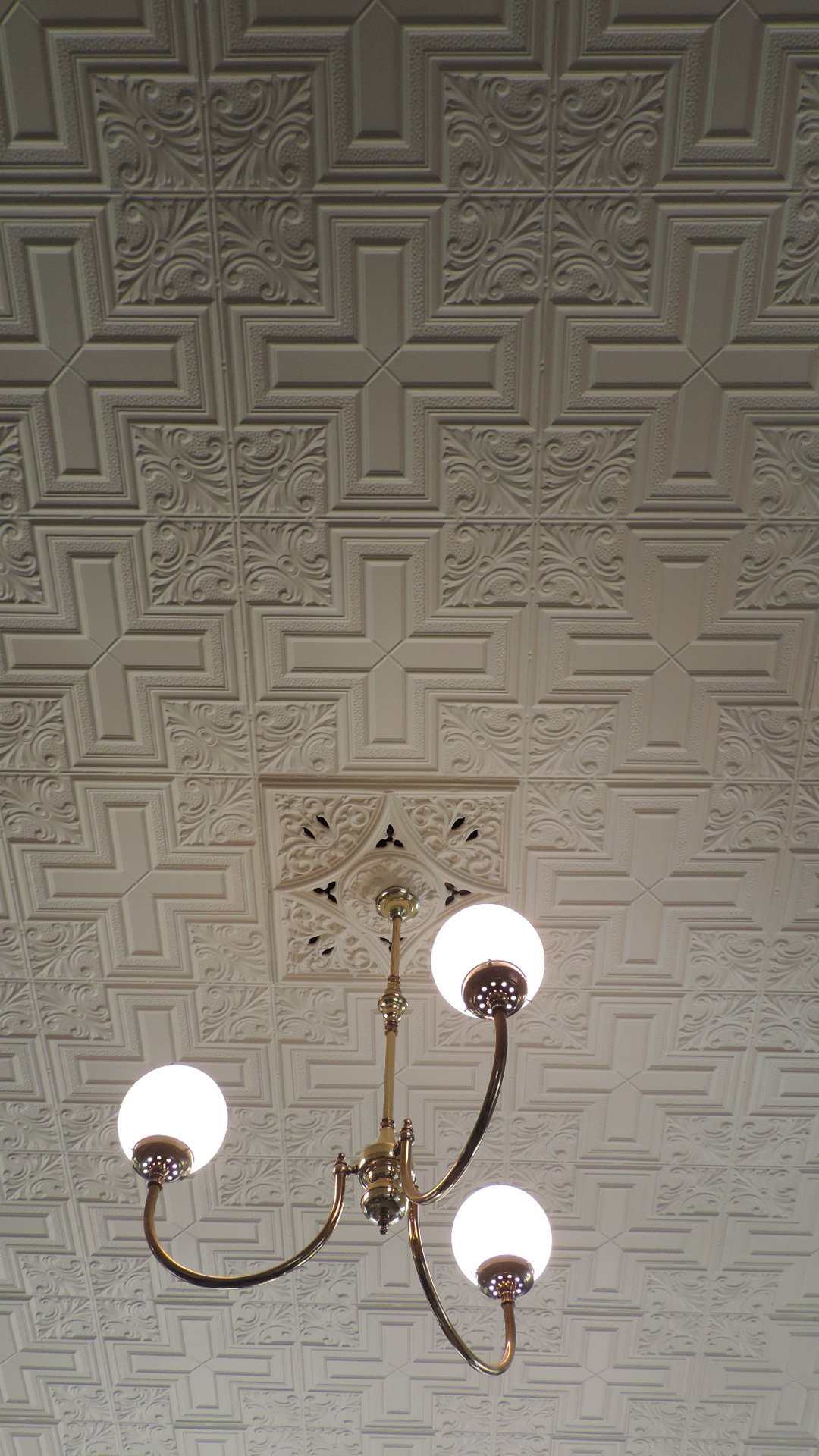
Pressed metal ceiling with fleur-de-lis and Greek cross motifs 2015

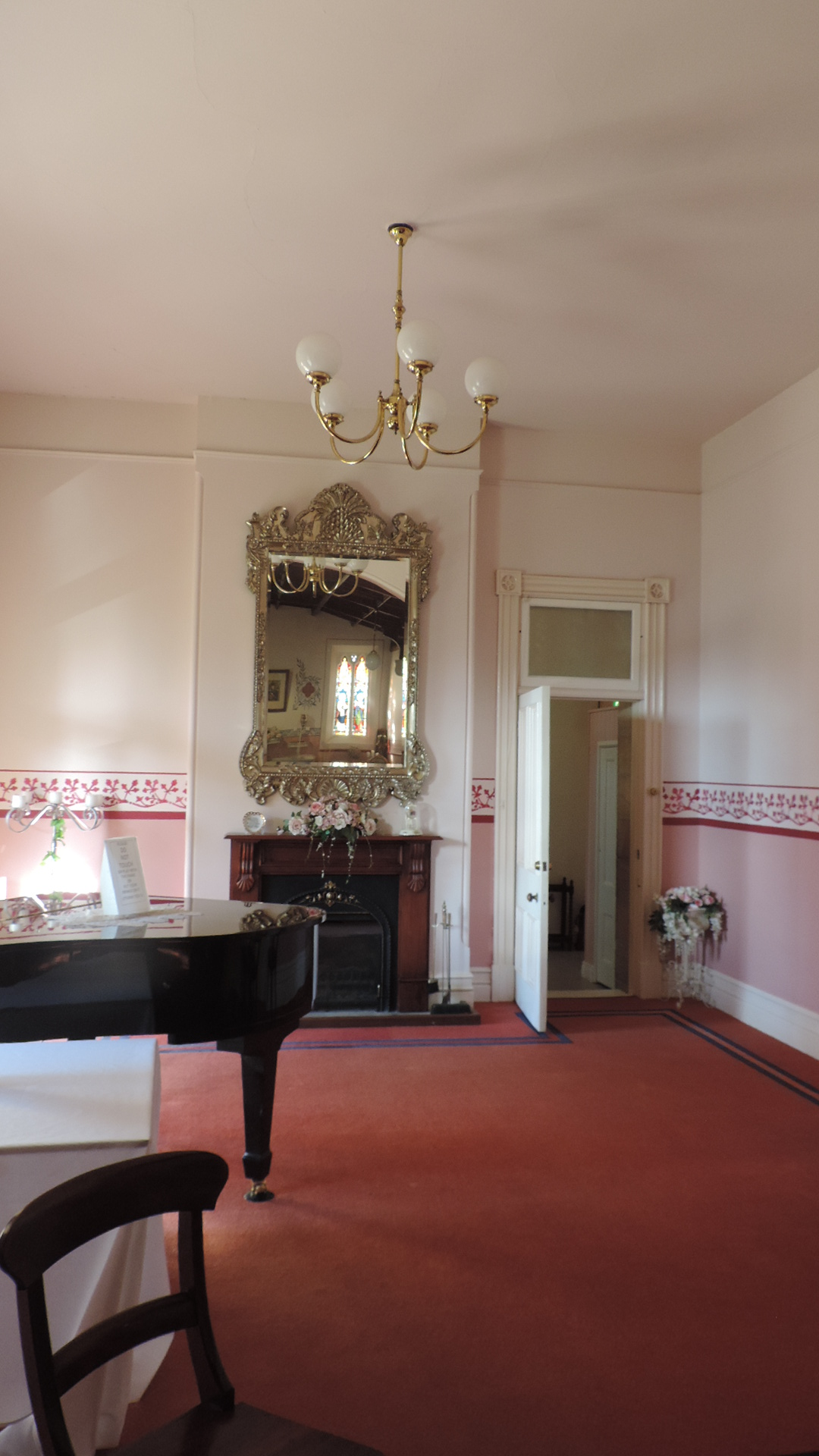
Rear of chapel, 2015

The chapel, which is at the eastern end of the corridor, is entered through a stained timber door with trefoil arched cutouts, surmounted by a triangular arched transom light. The chapel comprises two identifiable sections, the southern end being the original chapel, and the northern end a later addition; these are separated by a round arched opening in a central wall. The coffered timber ceiling, of the southern end, rakes toward the long sides of the room, to timber brackets which are supported on Norman-inspired corbels. A perforated timber frieze, just below the timber ceiling allows ventilation. On the southern wall of the room, adjacent to where a raised platform indicates the chancel area, are four fine stained glass window panels, in trefoil arched openings, depicting the four Evangelists and from the Royal Bavarian Art Institute for Stained Glass. The eastern wall of the front section of the cheap features large pointed arched window openings, with grisaille stained glass panels. The more rudimentary rear section of the chapel has a timber fireplace, a walk through sash window and French door with transom light opening to the adjacent verandah. To the north of the chapel, and separated by a stair hall, is the 1914 addition, which comprises large rooms with Wunderlich pressed metal ceilings featuring fleur-de-lis and Greek cross motifs and rendered walls with dado and picture rails impressed in the plaster.

On the western end of the central corridor of the ground floor, through a cedar doorway with transom and sidelights, originally to the exterior, is another half turn cedar stair. Two large rooms beyond this, with timber boarded ceilings and vertical sash windows, have been recently joined with a six leaf folding door. There is a generous bay window in the southern wall of this space. To the north of the ground floor are ancillary spaces, housed both in the rear of the western wing and in enclosed verandah spaces of the central bay.

The first floor of the former convent is, again, arranged around a central corridor, with timber boarded ceiling, running through the central bay terminated by large rooms in the flanking wings. Housed in the central bay, and accessed from the corridor, are many former bedroom cells, the northern ones of which access the rear verandah.

Above the chapel, in the eastern wing of the first floor, is another former dormitory, which features a vaulted timber ceiling, with moulded cedar ribs and purlins, and panels of stained pine boarding. The ribs are supported on Norman-inspired corbels. Half glazed French doors open from this room to the adjacent verandah. A transverse wall has divided the room, which was formerly the largest in the 1893 section of the convent, into two smaller spaces.

The western wing of the first floor of the building houses a very large, former dormitory space, with a lengthwise running timber boarded ceiling, flanked by generous coves formed by slender timber slats also running lengthwise. This ceiling features early paintwork, generally salmon pink and aqua on the coves.

The 1914 south eastern wing comprises a central corridor, off which many small former cells are accessed. Again, details in this section of the building; including the Wunderlich ceiling, joinery and glazing reflect the later date of its construction.

Two stairways from the first floor of the convent, provide access to the attic space, in the ceiling of the convent. This room, which was formerly used as a dormitory, has horizontal timber boarded walls, which are raked towards the ceilings and punctuated by six dormer windows.

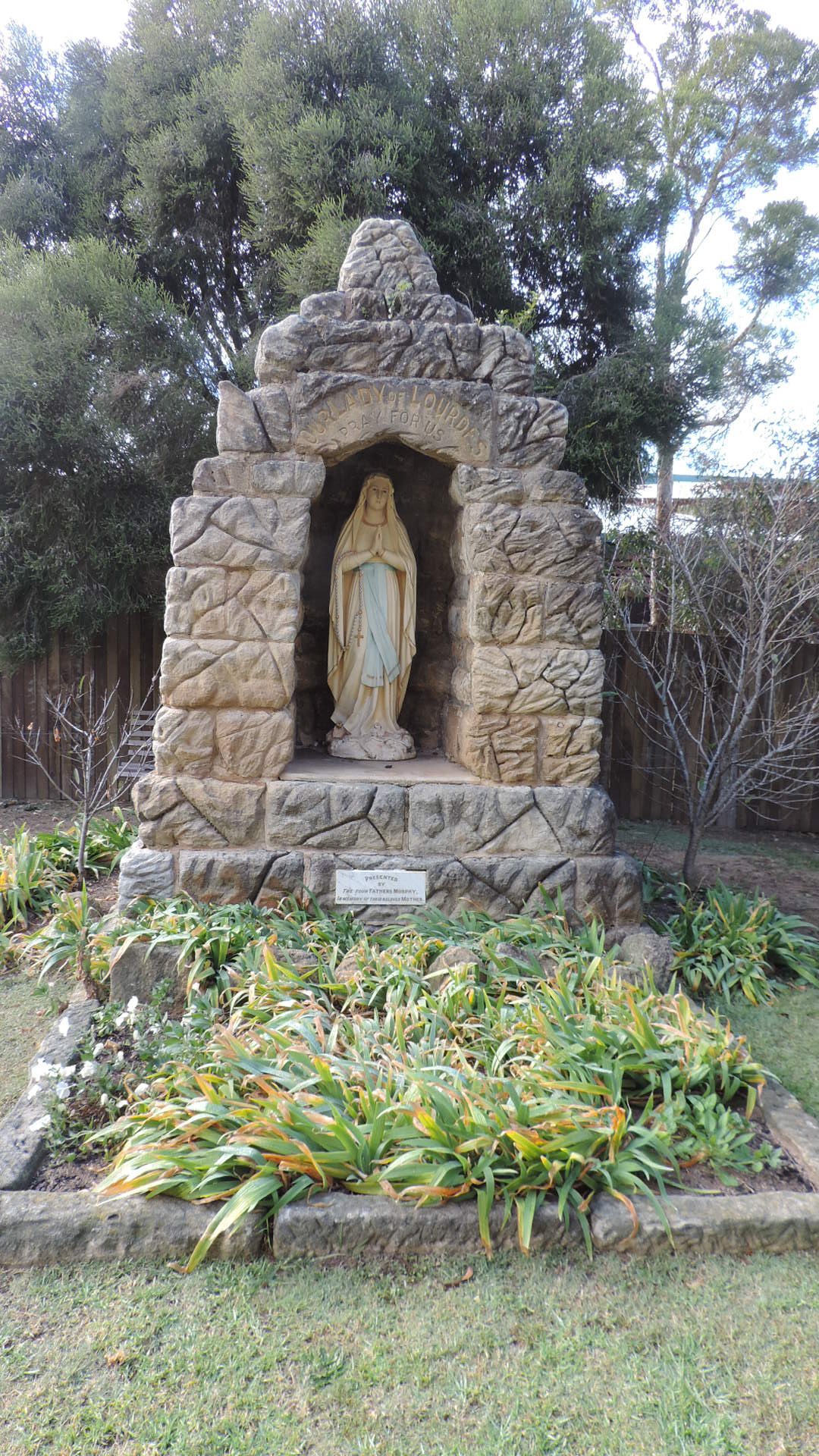
Grotto of Our Lady of Lourdes in the convent gardens, 2015

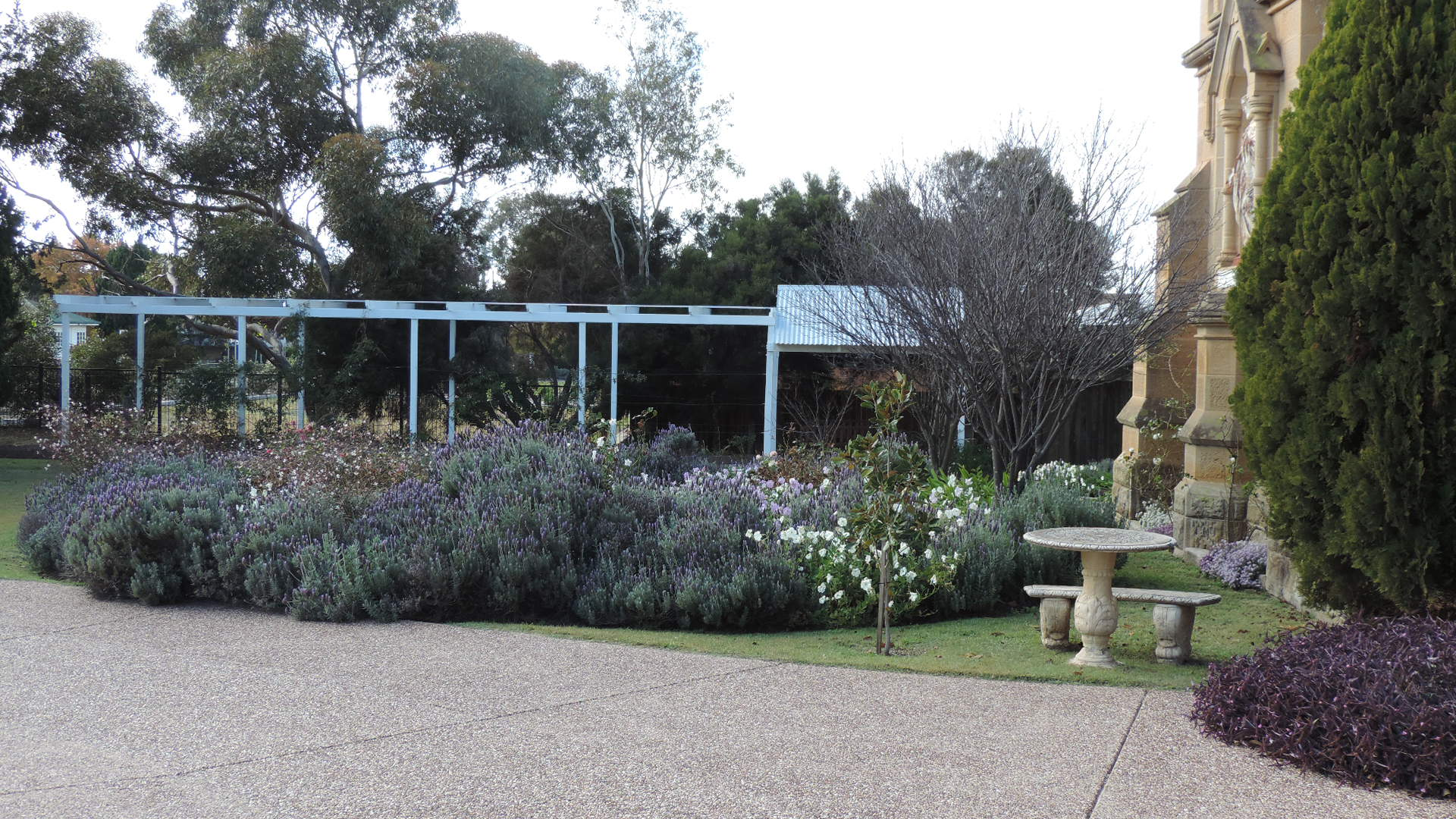
Front gardens of the convent, 2015

The grounds in which the convent sits, contain many features which add to the amenity of the building, including the circular front walkway with central statue; the rose gardens to the east of this and the grotto.

== Heritage listing ==
The former Our Lady of Assumption Convent was listed on the Queensland Heritage Register on 21 October 1992 having satisfied the following criteria.

The place is important in demonstrating the evolution or pattern of Queensland's history.

The former Our Lady of Assumption Convent demonstrates the pattern of growth of Warwick as a large centre of development on the Darling Downs; and the pattern of growth of the Sisters of Mercy in Queensland.

The place demonstrates rare, uncommon or endangered aspects of Queensland's cultural heritage.

The building houses some fine and rare stained glass panels, from the Royal Bavarian Art Institute of Stained Glass in Munich.

The place is important in demonstrating the principal characteristics of a particular class of cultural places.

The building is a good example of ecclesiastical Victorian architecture, influenced by the revival of interest in Gothic architecture during this period and adapted to the sub-tropical Queensland climate. It demonstrates the principal characteristics of Sisters of Mercy convents, in its layout, finishes and features.

The place is important because of its aesthetic significance.

The former convent has considerable aesthetic value, as a well composed substantial sandstone building, with fine detailing, including sandstone carvings and tracery; stained glass panels; and internal joinery, particularly the timber ceilings.

The place has a strong or special association with a particular community or cultural group for social, cultural or spiritual reasons.

Cloisters has a strong association with the Sisters of Mercy in Queensland and the catholic community of Warwick.

The place has a special association with the life or work of a particular person, group or organisation of importance in Queensland's history.

The building is significant as the home of one of the many branch houses of All Hallows' Convent, from where many of the state's early educational and social programmes were established.
