= First St Mary's Church, Warwick =

First St Mary's Roman Catholic Church, Warwick
- St Mary of the Assumption Church
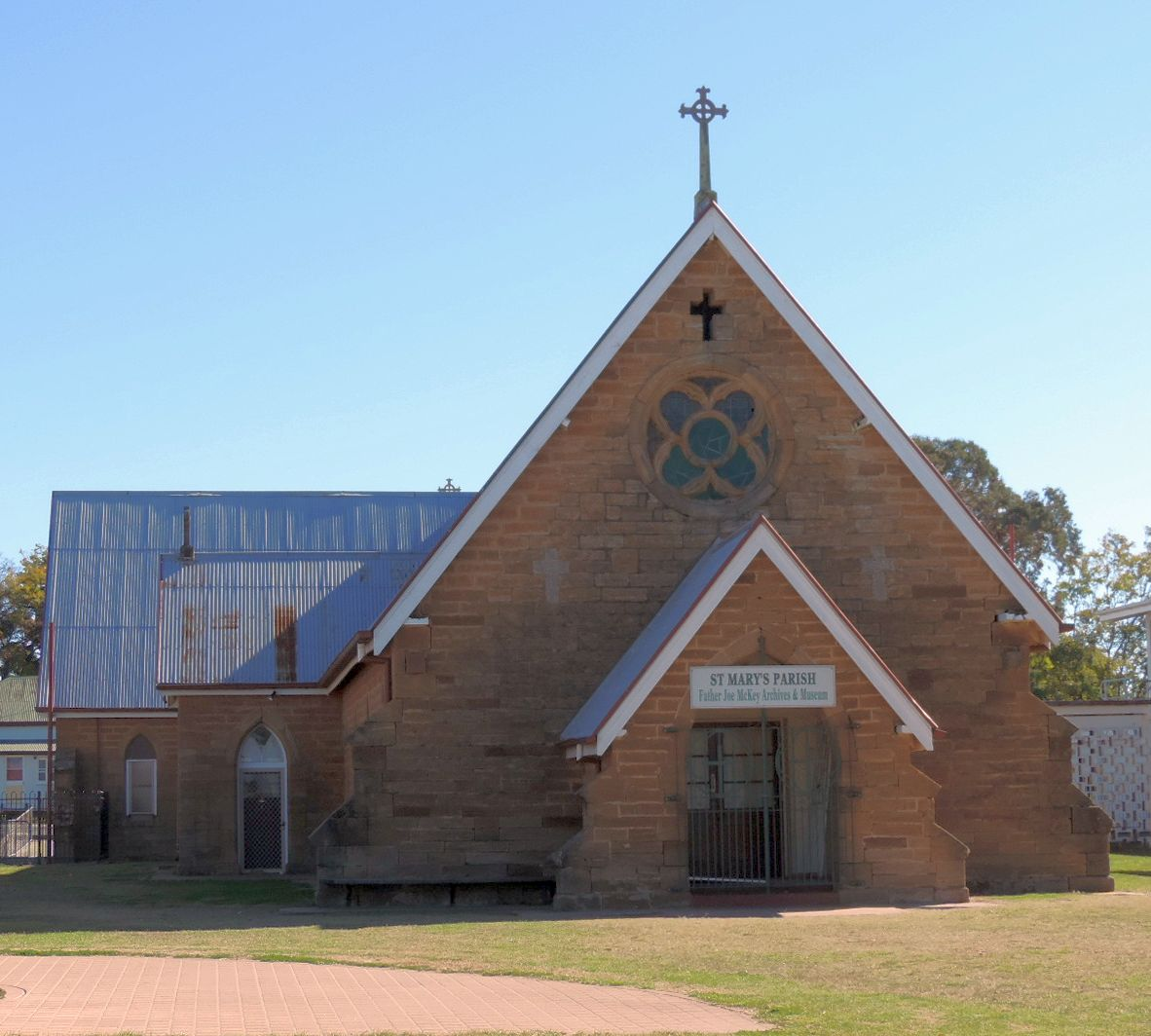
- First St Mary's Roman Catholic Church, 2015
- First St Mary's Roman Catholic Church, Warwick
- 28.2191°S 152.0314°E
- Address: 163 Palmerin Street, Warwick, Southern Downs Region, Queensland
- Country: Australia
- Denomination: Roman Catholic

History
- Status: Church (1865–1926); Community use (1926–present)
- Dedication: St Mary of the Assumption

Architecture
- Functional status: Community meeting hall
- Architect: Benjamin Joseph Backhouse
- Architectural type: Church
- Style: Gothic
- Years built: 1863–1865
- Closed: 1926 (as a church)

Queensland Heritage Register
- Official name: St Mary's Church (former), St Mary of the Assumption Church, St Mary's Church
- Type: State heritage (built)
- Designated: 21 October 1992
- Reference no.: 600958
- Significant period: 1860s–1900s (historical) ongoing (social); 1860s–1890s (fabric)
- Significant components: Hall, church, views to, stained glass window/s, school/school room
- Builders: C A Doran

The First St Mary's Roman Catholic Church is a heritage-listed sandstone Roman Catholic former church building at 163 Palmerin Street, Warwick, Southern Downs Region, Queensland, Australia. It was designed by Benjamin Joseph Backhouse and built from 1863 to 1865 by CA Doran. It is also known as St Mary of the Assumption Church and St Mary's Church. It was added to the Queensland Heritage Register on 21 October 1992.

Following the consecration of the Second St Mary's Church in 1926, the First St Mary's Church was deconsecrated as a church and has subsequently been used for community purposes.

== History ==
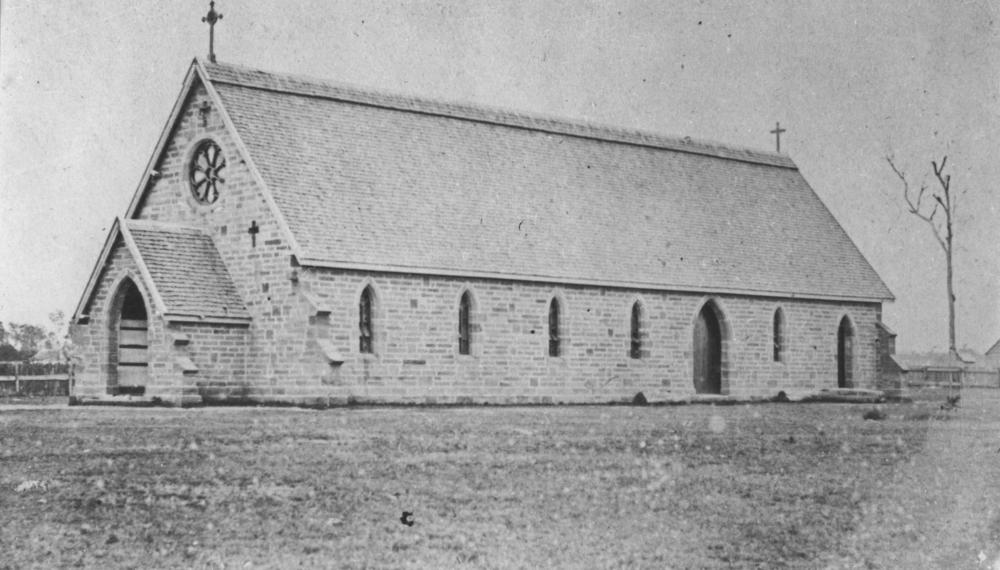
ca. 1865

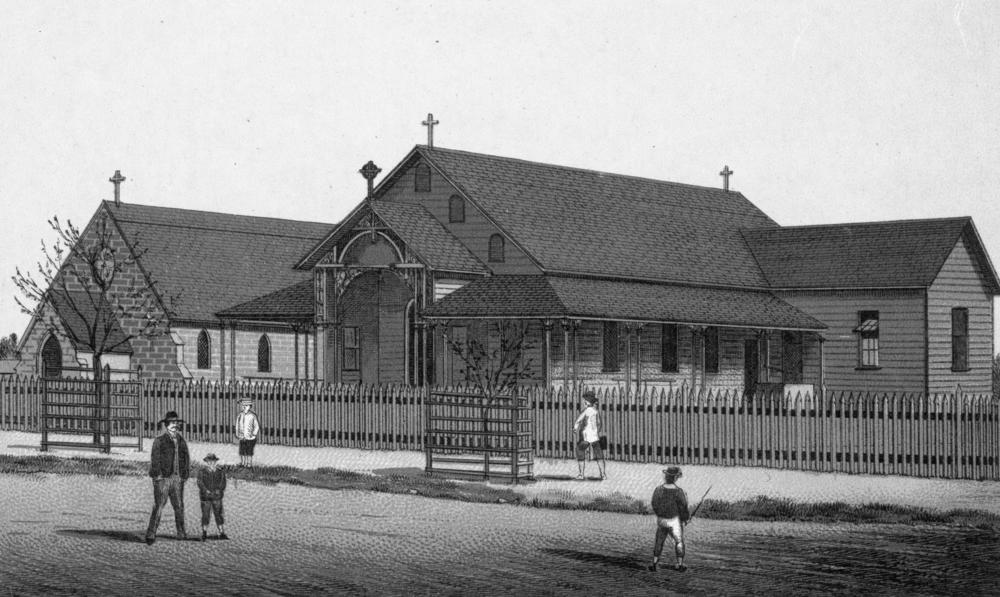
School with the church in background, ca. 1886

The first Saint Mary's Church, Warwick is a substantial sandstone building, constructed 1863–1865 to designs of prominent Brisbane architect, Benjamin Backhouse.

From the 1840s, it seems that informal Roman Catholic services were held in Warwick by visiting priests from Sydney, Ipswich and Brisbane. The first recorded mass was held in 1854 by Rev. Father McGinty who travelled from Ipswich, and this was celebrated at the Horse and Jockey Inn, Palmerin Street, where services for most other denominations were held at this time.

In 1862 Warwick became a separate parish of the church, only one year after the Borough of Warwick was declared a municipality on 25 May 1861. The first priest was Dr John Cani (who became the first Bishop of Rockhampton in 1882). By 20 August 1863, discussions were being held for the erection of a church in Palmerin Street, the main street of Warwick. £180 was needed for the purchase of land and £20 was subscribed on that day.

Various people, including Michael Knole, William Cowper and Sarah Ransley acquired the various future church lots (Allotments 7–12 of Section 49) by Deed of Grant on 16 August 1860. By September 1863, John Cani and James Quinn, the parish priest and Bishop of Brisbane respectively, became the registered owners of these allotments.

The plan for the church was duly prepared by prominent Brisbane architect, Benjamin Backhouse, to the specifications that it was to be simple but tasteful, in the Gothic style and in stone or brick. Benjamin Joseph Backhouse arrived in Brisbane in May 1861, and designed many buildings of architectural pretension in Queensland over the next six years, before he departed for New South Wales by 1868. He was responsible for the design of many churches including the second St Stephen's Roman Catholic Cathedral in Brisbane, additions to St John's Pro-Cathedral in Brisbane, as well as many other smaller regional churches.

Despite the setback of severe damage during a thunder storm the church the building was officially opened on 23 August 1865 by Bishop Quinn, the first Roman Catholic Bishop of Brisbane. At this time the church was named the St Mary of the Assumption, now popularly shortened to St Mary's. This original building consisted of only the nave of the present church, with side entrances, not through porches, but simply accessing the body of the church directly. The roof of the building was slated or shingled. The contractor was CA Doran and the structure cost about £1500. The stone for the construction of the church was obtained from the Sidling Quarries, which were a small group of quarries in Warwick.

In 1865 Dr Cani was succeeded by Father Scortechini, who was soon after replaced by Father Hogan. By 1867 a Catholic school, run by the Misses O'Mara until the arrival of the Sisters of Mercy in 1874, was established in the church by the next parish priest, Father O'Reilly. The church was partitioned with calico screens, firstly to separate the sanctuary from the teaching area and, later to divide the teaching area into smaller rooms in the body of the church. O'Reilly was replaced by Father McDonagh, who was the first resident priest, and after him in 1876 came Father James Horan who was to remain in Warwick until 1905. Horan was responsible for the completion of the church by 1894, when the transepts and chancel were added. By this time porches over the side entrances were also completed.

Monsignor Michael Potter was posted as a curate to Warwick in 1891, and continued there as the parish priest after Horan's death in 1905. It was Potter who decided that the original St Mary's Church was no longer adequate for the needs of his community. Thus he sought plans for the construction of a second larger church, further north on the same block in Palmerin Street. Local architects, Dornbusch & Connolly drew plans for the second St Mary's church which, like the original church, was to conform to a cruciform plan, but only the body has thus far been completed. The new church was constructed between 1920 and 1926, when it was officially opened.

After the opening of the new church, the original St Mary's was partitioned, lined and used as school rooms, for the Catholic primary school which began in the building in its earliest days. It has remained as a community meeting hall and store to this day.

== Description ==
The former St Mary's Church is situated within the school grounds of the local Catholic primary school in Palmerin Street, Warwick.

The church is of solid sandstone construction, and conforms to a cruciform plan, with nave extending to the east, transepts to the north and south and chancel to the west. The sandstone, which is finely tooled, is generally coursed, with larger blocks used as quoining.

The church sits on a plinth, formed by a course of sandstone projecting slightly from the face of the walls. The corrugated iron roof is gabled and has overhanging eaves lined with wide timber beaded boarding which returns to the interior of the space.

The eastern entrance facade features a small gabled entrance porch, with a pointed arched opening formed with smooth-faced sandstone blocks. Buttressing is formed by extensions of the faces of both the porch and main body of the church, this detail is repeated on the transepts and western end of the building.

Above the porch is a rose window, of heavy tracery, with some early glass panels; above this is a ventilation opening in the form of a Latin Cross. Surmounting the apex of the gable is a carved stone Latin Cross.

The north and south, transverse elevation feature projecting side entrances and transepts, among regularly spaced single lancet window openings. The entrances from the sides of the church, feature pointed arched doorways on the eastern face, and single window openings of plate tracery, with small quatrefoil opening above. The transepts feature large rose windows in the gables.

The western, chancel, face of the church features a large geometric tracery opening, incorporating four lancet openings, two quatrefoils and a rose feature above.

Internally, the building retains very little of its ecclesiastical character, with the exception of the window openings. The walls are rendered, the floor carpeted and a ceiling of fibrous sheeting has been inserted. The space is divided into several smaller spaces with v-j boarding. The sandstone of church suffers from rising damp problems.

== Heritage listing ==
The first St Mary's Church was listed on the Queensland Heritage Register on 21 October 1992 having satisfied the following criteria.

The place is important in demonstrating the evolution or pattern of Queensland's history.

The church is important in demonstrating the growth of Warwick during the 1860s when the town became the centre of an agricultural region. The church is able to demonstrate the spread of the catholic church through regional areas where substantial buildings were erected in the mid nineteenth century.

The former St Mary's church is associated with the early prominent Brisbane architect, Benjamin Backhouse.

The place demonstrates rare, uncommon or endangered aspects of Queensland's cultural heritage.

The former St Mary's Church is rare as one of the earliest extant sandstone buildings in Warwick, and the earliest sandstone church.

The place is important in demonstrating the principal characteristics of a particular class of cultural places.

The building is a good example of masonry church design of mid nineteenth century Queensland, influenced by the English revival of early Gothic architecture.

The place is important because of its aesthetic significance.

It is a well composed and constructed stone building, with fine stone tracery.

The place has a strong or special association with a particular community or cultural group for social, cultural or spiritual reasons.

The building has special associations with the Roman Catholic community in Warwick, as a former parish church and as the central focus of the catholic primary school since its construction in 1863–5.
