= Second St Mary's Church, Warwick =

Second St Mary's Roman Catholic Church, Warwick
- St Mary of the Assumption Church
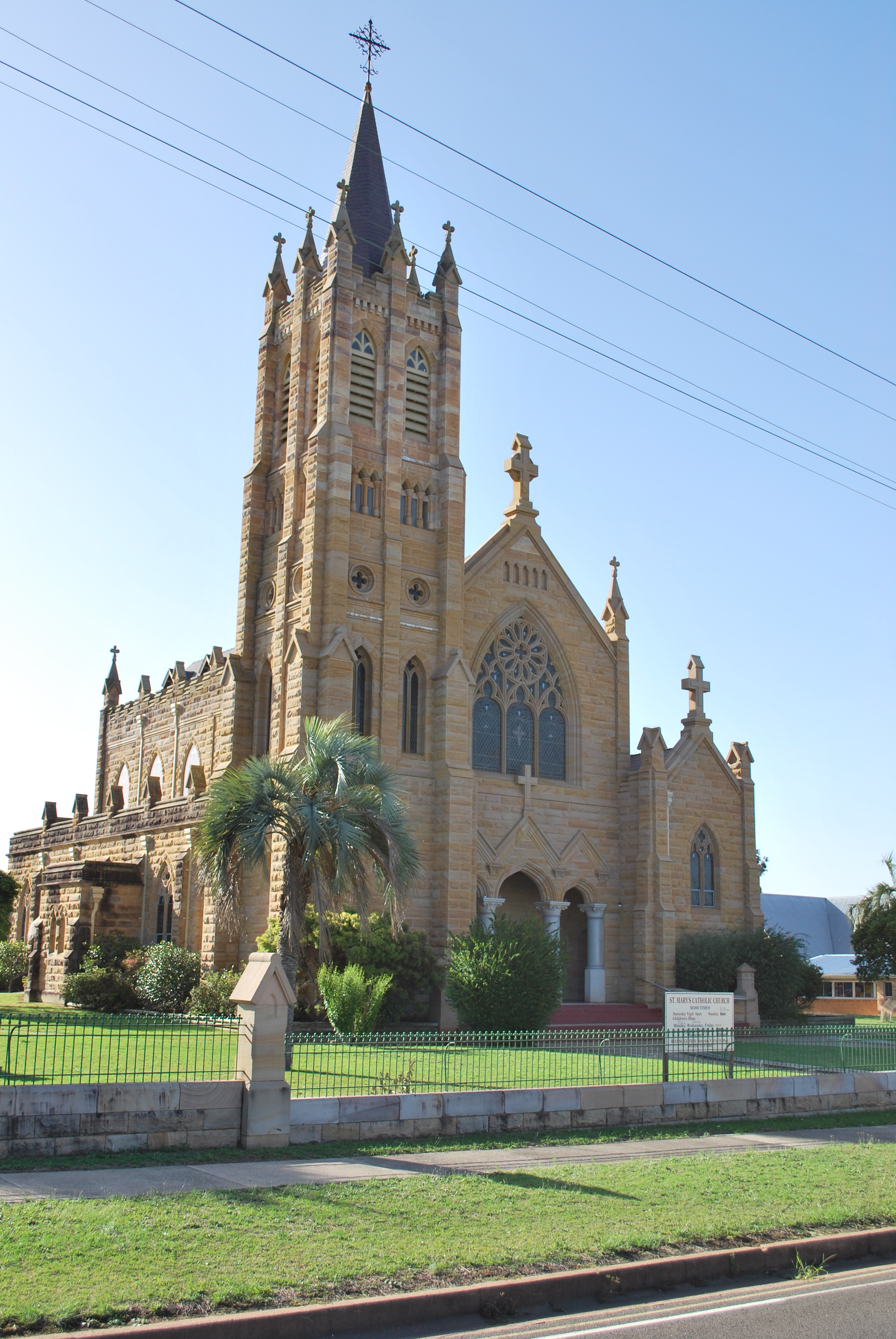
- Second St Mary's Roman Catholic Church
- Second St Mary's Roman Catholic Church, Warwick
- 28.2198°S 152.0313°E
- Address: 163 Palmerin Street, Warwick, Southern Downs Region, Queensland
- Country: Australia
- Denomination: Roman Catholic
- Website: stmarysparishwarwick.org.au

History
- Status: Church
- Dedication: St Mary of the Assumption

Architecture
- Functional status: Active
- Architect(s): Dornbusch & Connolly
- Architectural type: Church
- Style: Gothic
- Years built: 1920–1926

Administration
- Diocese: Toowoomba
- Parish: St Mary's Parish

Clergy
- Priest: Fr. Franco Filipetto

Queensland Heritage Register
- Official name: St Mary's Church, St Mary of the Assumption Church
- Type: state heritage (built)
- Designated: 21 October 1992
- Reference no.: 600959
- Significant period: 1920s (historical) ongoing (social); 1920s (fabric)
- Significant components: church, views to, tower, stained glass window/s, furniture/fittings

The second St Mary's Roman Catholic Church is a heritage-listed sandstone Catholic church at 163 Palmerin Street in Warwick in the Southern Downs Region, Queensland, Australia. It was designed by Dornbusch & Connolly and built from 1920 to 1926. It is also known as St Mary of the Assumption Church. It was added to the Queensland Heritage Register on 21 October 1992.

== History ==
St Mary's Church, Warwick was constructed between 1920 and 1926, as the second Roman Catholic church of that name in Warwick, to designs of local architects Dornbusch and Connolly.

From the 1840s, it seems that informal Roman Catholic services were held in Warwick by visiting priests from Sydney, Ipswich and Brisbane. The first recorded mass was held in 1854 by Rev. Father McGinty who travelled from Ipswich, and this was celebrated at the Horse and Jockey Inn, Palmerin Street, where services for most other denominations were held at this time.

In 1862 Warwick became a separate parish of the church, only one year after the Borough of Warwick was declared a municipality on 25 May 1861. The first priest was Dr John Cani who was soon pursuing the need for a church building. A site was chosen in Palmerin Street and the land was acquired on the south of block bordered by Palmerin, Wood, Percy and Acacia Streets in central Warwick.

Plans were duly drawn by prominent Brisbane architect, Benjamin Backhouse, to the specifications that it was to be simple but tasteful, in the Gothic style and in stone or brick. Despite the setback of severe damage during a thunderstorm the first St Mary's church was officially opened on August 23, 1865, by Bishop Quinn, the first Bishop of Queensland. The contractor was CA Doran and the structure cost £1500. The stone for the construction of the church was obtained from the Sidling Quarries, which were a small group of quarries in Warwick.

Dr Cani left the parish and was succeeded by a number of priests in quick succession until Father James Horan was appointed in 1876, and remained the parish priest of Warwick until his death in 1905. Horan was responsible for completing the original church with the addition of transepts and the chancel by 1894.

Monsignor Michael Potter was posted as a curate to Warwick in 1891 and continued there as the parish priest after Horan's death in 1905. It was Potter who decided in the 1910s that the original St Mary's Church was no longer adequate for the needs of his community, and a larger more grand church was required.

Local architects, Dornbusch and Connolly were commissioned to design the new church, which was built on land immediately to the north of the original St Mary's Church. This land, Allotments 3–6 on Section 49, was acquired by Samuel Elphick on August 16, 1860, by Deed of Grant, and was bought by the Church by 1880. The foundation stone of the new church was laid by the Archbishop of Melbourne, Daniel Mannix assisted by Archbishop of Brisbane James Duhig on 29 February 1920.

The original plans for this church conformed to the traditional cruciform plan, with the chancel extending almost to the Acacia Street boundary of the property. Two lawsuits were held during the construction of the church, firstly over ownership of the rear section of the property and then with the contractors, Kerr and Clark who were sued for breach of contract, making work cease. This delayed the building work and meant that the construction of the church, which was eventually finished by day labour, took six years. The rear section of the church, including the transepts and the chancel was not completed, and, indeed, remains incomplete in 1995. The western wall and shallow chancel were temporarily undertaken in rendered brick.

Sandstone for the church was obtained from the nearby Yangan quarry and the granite, used in the piers both internally and externally, from Greymare. A damp proof course, of sheet lead in asphalt was inserted to all the walls.

The church was designed in a style described at the time of its construction as a revival of Gothic architecture practiced between 1274 and 1377, or Decorated or Middle Pointed Gothic. This is evident in the traceries and mouldings around the church. Major departures from this style include the internal nave piers, thought to be of earlier, Norman influence and the entrance porch of the later 15th century pointed Gothic.

Stained glass windows were the design and manufacture of Messrs RS Exton and Co of Brisbane. The supervisor of the stone work was Mr FJ Fuller of Toowoomba, and other building works were supervised by Mr FJ Corbett of Brisbane. St Mary's was constructed at a cost of A£40,000.

When built, St Mary's incorporated electrical lighting, a fine set of stations of the Cross, and a pneumatically blown organ. By July 1929 a High Altar and two side altars designed by Dornbusch and Connolly and executed by Messrs F. Williams and Co of Ipswich were made for the church from white Sicilian marble with panes of Red Verona and Verde Antico. The following year a pulpit, again designed by the church architects and made by F Williams and Co. was introduced to the sanctuary.

The church was opened on 21 March 1926 by the Archbishop of Brisbane, James Duhig. In 1929 a grotto, a small replica of that at Lourdes, was constructed to the north of the church and this was donated by Mr and Mrs Martin Crane.

The first church was then used as a school building (and later as a meeting hall).

== Description ==
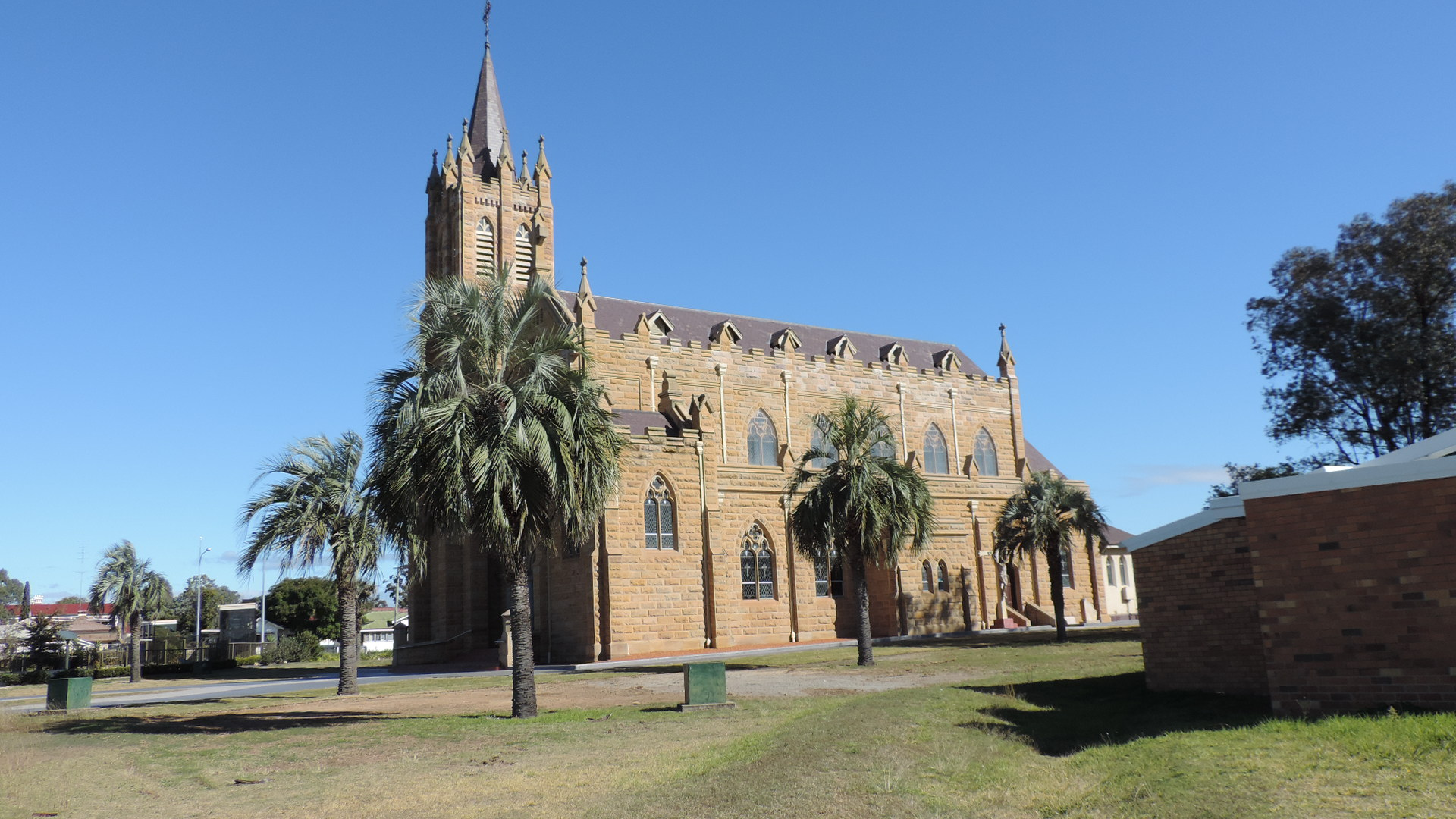
Second St Mary's Roman Catholic Church, 2015

St Mary's Church is a substantial sandstone building prominently located on the corner of Palmerin and Wood Streets, Warwick. The church, a local landmark, is visible from most areas in Warwick. It is situated on land adjoining the local catholic primary school in which the former St Mary's Church is situated.

The church, which remains incomplete, was designed with a traditional cruciform plan, with entrance from Palmerin Street and north and south transepts and a sanctuary west of this. The body and tower of the church and were the only parts completed resulting in a curiously proportioned building.

St Mary's consists of a central nave, flanked by side aisles, a shallow sanctuary and a large tower on the eastern, entrance facade. The nave and aisles are expressed on the exterior of the church with distinct purple Bangor slate gabled roofs; the height of the aisle roofs allowing the loftier nave to be naturally lit by clerestory windows.

The tower, projecting through 29 metres (95 ft) on the south eastern corner of the building, is surmounted by an octagonal spire protruding above a crenellated parapet through which eight spired pinnacles project. The pinnacles, which extend from the angled buttressing strengthening the tower, are surmounted by sandstone fleur-de-lis, a motif which continues throughout the building. The tower features a number of openings repeated on all sides: a cinquefoil rose at the base; above which is a pair of double lancets with fleur-de-lis opening above; two quatrefoil openings; surmounted by two comparatively small tripartite lancet openings and finally, at the top, two larger lancet openings.

The building is constructed from coursed rock-faced sandstone with smooth-faced arch mouldings, string courses, copings, parapet detailing, tracery and carvings. The glazing in the building consists of leadlight panels, with stained and coloured glass sections.

The eastern entrance facade consists of a large central gabled bay adjoining a smaller gabled bay to the north and the tower to the south. Access is gained to a porch up seven stairs extending the width of the central bay, and through three segmental arches which are supported on circular granite columns with foliated capitals and resting on elongated octagonal bases. The archways are under a chevroned hood moulding resting on corbels; surmounting the central chevron is a cross. Above the porch opening is a large window of geometrical tracery, with lancets under a large circular light. Large sandstone crosses surmount the gable tops of both the central and subsidiary bays, which are demarcated by angled buttressing extending to pinnacles.

The northern and southern faces of the church consist of the transverse elevation of the aisles and, set back from these, the elevation of the nave. These elements are punctured with openings of geometric tracery featuring twin lancets and quatrefoil above. Concealing the roofs are parapets; over the aisle roof the parapets are moulded with protruding miniature gabled pinnacles and to the nave the parapet is crenellated with similar protruding pinnacles. The roof is punctured with ventilation gablets. Confessional rooms project from the transverse elevations of the building.

The western elevation of the church, which was to be extended, is of rendered brickwork and consists of a central gabled extension lower than the body of the church, flanked by two skillion roofed sections.

Entrance is gained to the body of the church via three double panelled timber doorways from the porch, and by two side entrances. The ashlar faced porch has a deeply coffered timber ceiling and a grey terrazzo floor with dark red border.

Internally the church has a six-bay nave, defined by a pointed arched arcade supported on granite columns with polished shafts. A large pointed chancel arch demarcates the sanctuary, which features a rose window and a fine marble High Altar. Two shallow side altars in pointed arched recesses flank the sanctuary and terminate the side aisles of the church

The concrete floor of the church is rendered with red ironite with terrazzo in the aisles featuring the recurring fleur-de-lis motif. The internal walls are all rendered masonry, with mouldings around windows and at dado rail height and below the clerestory windows of plaster.

The ceiling is of panels of diagonal timber boarding, alternately arranged. The timber king post roof trusses feature caps and sunk mouldings, with elegant moulded sweeps which rest on attached piers extending to the spandrels of the nave arches, where they are terminated by a carved sandstone corbel. Between the piers are the clerestory windows, featuring leadlight panels and a stained glass quatrefoil, the image on which differs on each window.

A gallery with silky oak panelling extending for one bay of the nave, is situated at the eastern end of the church and supported on cast iron columns. Confessional rooms are accessed from half glazed timber doors under recessed pointed archways in both aisles.

Many early features of the church remain intact, including the timber pews, timber-framed Stations of the Cross, and a marble memorial plaque to Rev. Jacobi Horan. The chancel features a very fine Gothic revival High Altar of white Sicilian marble with panels of red and green marble and matching side altars and pulpit.

== Heritage listing ==
St Mary's Church was listed on the Queensland Heritage Register on 21 October 1992 having satisfied the following criteria.

The place is important in demonstrating the evolution or pattern of Queensland's history.

The immense scale and size of the planned St Mary's Church demonstrates the importance of Warwick as a major provincial centre.

The place is important in demonstrating the principal characteristics of a particular class of cultural places.

St Mary's Church is important in demonstrating the characteristics of early twentieth-century Gothic revival churches, of which it is a fine example, although incomplete.

The place is important because of its aesthetic significance.

The building has many fine elements including the stonework, particularly the tracery and carvings; internal joinery; and a very fine marble High Altar, side altars and pulpit. The building is a landmark in Warwick as the highest and most prominent building in the town.

The place has a strong or special association with a particular community or cultural group for social, cultural or spiritual reasons.

The church has special associations with the Catholic church of Warwick as their parish church for over sixty years.

The place has a special association with the life or work of a particular person, group or organisation of importance in Queensland's history.

It has particular associations with Rev. Father Matthew Potter, under whose guidance the church was constructed.

== See also ==
- St Mary's Presbytery, Warwick, the church's presbytery which is also heritage-listed
