= Mick Lowcock =

Australian priest

Mick Lowcock OAM
- Born: 4 December 1948 (age 77)
- Other name: Father Mick
- Education: Pius XII Provincial Seminary
- Occupation: Roman Catholic priest
- Years active: 1973 to present
- Known for: His community work and his advocacy of multiculturism in North West Queensland

Ecclesiastical career
- Religion: Christianity
- Church: Roman Catholic Church
- Ordained: 10 August 1973
- Congregations served: Good Shepherd Catholic Church, Mount Isa (1995-); St. Patrick's Church, Winton; St Brigid's Church, Richmond
- Offices held: Parish Priest; Vicar General of the Roman Catholic Diocese of Townsville

Michael John Lowcock OAM (born 4 December 1948) is an Australian priest.

Based in Mount Isa where he has been the parish priest at the Good Shepherd Catholic Church since 1992, Lowcock is best known for his community work in North West Queensland, particularly among First Nations people.

== Life and career ==
Lowcock grew up in Bowen, Queensland and attended boarding school in Charters Towers.

Lowcock studied at the Pius XII Provincial Seminary in Brisbane prior to being ordained on 10 August 1973 at St Mary's Catholic School in Bowen where he had obtained his primary education.

After spending time in Ayr, Ingham and Townsville, Bishop Ray Benjamin decided to transfer Lowcock to a new parish.

Relocating to Mount Isa in 1992, Lowcock has been active in the community which has included being the local police chaplain . He is also credited with establishing a number of local services including a youth hub, local support groups for Murri people and the Jangawala Kitchen which provides meals to the homeless and to those in custody at the local police watchhouse.

Lowcock also established North West Queensland Indigenous Catholic Services Limited, which provides assistance to the disadvantaged, in particular local Aboriginal families.

An advocate of multiculturalism, Lowcock is also known for organising an annual multicultural festival in Mount Isa and for setting up a prayer room at the Catholic church to be used by local Muslims.

A proposal was put forward by Lowcock in 2019 of a low-custody facility being established in North West Queensland to negate the expensive need of transporting prisoners to facilities on the east coast only for them to be transported back to Mount Isa for court appearances. Lowcock's proposal was supported by state MP for Traeger Robbie Katter.

In 2021, Lowcock expressed his opposition to a local hotel's plans to open a new bottle shop in an old Blockbuster store.

Amid the crime crisis facing the Northern Territory town of Alice Springs in early 2023, Lowcock criticised the introduction of alcohol restrictions in the town as he believed the measures were encouraging people to travel elsewhere, including across the border into Queensland, to access alcohol.

Apart from his role in Mount Isa, Lowcock was appointed the diocesan administrator of the Roman Catholic Diocese of Townsville following the death of Bishop Michael Putney in 2014. Lowcock remained in the role until the ordination of Bishop Tim Harris in 2017.

== Honours ==
In 2001, Lowcock received the Centenary Medal in recognition of his distinguished service to the community.

Lowcock received a Medal of the Order of Australia in the 2004 Queen's Birthday Honours in recognition of his service to North West Queensland through his role in the Catholic Church.

In 2020, Lowcock was named as a Queensland Great.

Lowcock was nominated to be the Queensland's Senior Australian of the Year in 2023 but lost to child protection campaigner Claude Harvey. Harvey in turn was nominated for Senior Australian of the Year but lost to human rights campaigner Tom Calma.
