= Raymond Conway Benjamin =

Australian Catholic bishop (1925–2016)

The Most Reverend Raymond Conway Benjamin
- Bishop Emeritus of Diocese of Townsville
- Diocese: Townsville
- Installed: 9 May 1984
- Term ended: 18 April 2000
- Predecessor: Leonard Anthony Faulkner
- Successor: Michael Ernest Putney

Orders
- Ordination: 25 July 1949 at St Joseph's Cathedral, Rockhampton by Andrew Gerard Tynan
- Consecration: 9 May 1984 at Townsville by Francis Roberts Rush

Personal details
- Born: Raymond Conway Benjamin; 24 February 1925 Rockhampton, Queensland, Australia
- Died: 6 March 2016 (aged 91) Brisbane, Queensland, Australia
- Buried: Sacred Heart Cathedral, Townsville
- Denomination: Catholic Church
- Occupation: Catholic bishop
- Motto: At your right hand forever

Raymond Conway Benjamin (24 February 1925 – 7 March 2016) was an Australian Roman Catholic bishop. He served as Bishop of Townsville for more than 25 years.

== Early life ==
Benjamin was born in Rockhampton to Evan and Margaret Benjamin and received all his education in Queensland. He was educated Our Lady’s Infant School and later at the Christian Brothers College, West Rockhampton. He then went to Pius XII Provincial Seminary in Brisbane to study for the priesthood.

== Priesthood ==
Benjamin was ordained a priest for the Diocese of Rockhampton on 25 July 1949 at St Joseph's Cathedral, Rockhampton by Bishop Andrew Gerard Tynan, Bishop of Rockhampton. He was ordained along with two other priests. All three were former students of Christian Brothers College, West Rockhampton.

As a priest, he served in many parishes across the diocese. He later served as vicar general of the diocese and was parish priest of Yeppoon.

== Episcopate ==
On 14 February 1984, Benjamin was appointed Bishop of Townsville by Pope John Paul II. He was consecrated as Bishop of Townsville on 9 Mary 1984 at an outdoor ordination at the Dean Park Soundshell, Townsville by Francis Rush, Archbishop of Brisbane.

In 1994, he wrote to a survivor of sexual abuse, expressing his shame that a priest had behaved so badly. The survivor was living in north Queensland at the time although the abuse had been unconnected to the Benjamin's diocese.

During his episcopate, he "tolerated" many unorthodox liturgical practices, citing pastoral reasons for doing so, including "substituting Mass readings with non-scriptural texts", "the use of unapproved Eucharistic Prayers on certain occasions" and "long-accepted [unorthodox] customs regarding lay ministers of the Eucharist".

He also attempted to radically change the ecclesial structure of the Diocese. In 1991, the Diocese released a report called "Never-Ending Story" which proposed shifting from "parishes" to "Small Catholic Communities", with a servant-leader/coordinator appointed by the Bishop to oversee the community. This person would not necessarily be a priest.

Between 1986 and 1997, the level of average weekly Mass attendance in the Diocese of Townsville fell from 17.6 per cent to 9.6 per cent, giving it one of the lowest rates of Mass attendance of any diocese in Australia. As of 1998, there wasn't a single man in formation for the priesthood for the Diocese of Townsville and during his 25 year episcopacy, he only ordained three men to the priesthood.

== Retirement and death ==
Benjamin submitted his resignation to the Holy Father on 1 February 2000 and it was accepted on 18 April 2000. He remained as Apostolic Administrator of the diocese until his successor, Bishop Michael Putney was appointed on 24 January 2001.

Following retirement, he retained a strong interest in the life of the diocese. At the time of the death in office of his successor, Bishop Michael Putney, and the subsequent vacancy in the Diocese of Townsville, Benjamin was still living.

He died in Brisbane on 6 March 2016 and was buried in Sacred Heart Cathedral, Townsville.

== See also ==
Catholic Church titles
Preceded by Leonard Anthony Faulkner	Bishop of Townsville; 1984–2000	Succeeded by Michael Ernest Putney
