= Michael Putney (bishop) =

Australian prelate (1946–2014)

The Most Reverend Michael Putney
- Bishop of Diocese of Townsville
- Diocese: Townsville
- Installed: 27 March 2001
- Term ended: 28 March 2014
- Predecessor: Raymond Conway Benjamin
- Successor: Timothy James Harris
- Other posts: Auxiliary bishop of Archdiocese of Brisbane (1995–2001); Titular Bishop of Mizigi (1995–2001)

Orders
- Ordination: 28 June 1969 by Henry Joseph Kennedy
- Consecration: 27 July 1995 by John Alexius Bathersby

Personal details
- Born: Michael Ernest Putney; 20 June 1946 Gladstone, Queensland, Australia
- Died: 28 March 2014 (aged 67) Townsville, Queensland, Australia
- Buried: Sacred Heart Cathedral, Townsville
- Denomination: Catholic Church
- Occupation: Catholic bishop
- Education: Pontifical Gregorian University; Catholic University of Louvain

Michael Ernest Putney AM (20 June 1946 – 28 March 2014) was an Australian Roman Catholic bishop and a recognised leader of the ecumenical movement in Australia.

== Early life ==
Born in Gladstone, Queensland, Putney attended St Joseph's Convent in Townsville for his primary education, and Our Lady's Mount (now Ignatius Park College), also in Townsville, and St Columban's College in the Brisbane suburb of Albion for his secondary education. He entered the Pius XII Provincial Seminary at Banyo after graduating high school.

== Priesthood ==
Putney was ordained a priest for the Archdiocese of Brisbane on 28 June 1969 by Bishop Henry Joseph Kennedy.

His first appointment was as assistant priest at Burleigh Heads. In 1971, he was sent to Rome to study for a Licentiate in Theology at the Pontifical Gregorian University, which he completed in 1973. The same year, he travelled to Belgium to study at the Catholic University of Louvain for 18 months. He returned to Brisbane and became a lecturer at the Pius XII Provincial Seminary while also serving as an assistant priest at North Ipswich. In 1980, he became Vice-Rector and Academic Dean of the seminary.

As a priest, he became interested in the ecumenical movement of the Church. In 1975, he became a member of the Ecumenical Commission of the Archdiocese of Brisbane, while also serving as the Church's representative on the Faith and Order Commission of the Queensland Ecumenical Council. In 1978, he became the liaison priest to the charismatic prayer groups and communities of the Archdiocese. His ecumenical spirit would become one of the hallmarks of his ministry, both as a priest and later, as a bishop.

In 1982, he returned to the Pontifical Gregorian University to complete a Doctorate of Theology. While there, he also served as an assistant professor of theology. He graduated Summa Cum Laude. He returned to Brisbane in 1986 and was appointed assistant priest of Scarborough, while also returning to lecturing and serving as vice-rector of the seminary. In 1989, he was appointed assistant priest at Maroochydore. In 19990, he took a sabbatical year as Visiting Scholar at Weston School of Theology in Boston, United States. While there, he was priest in residence of St Cecilia's Church, Boston.

== Episcopate ==
on 31 May 1995, Putney was named Titular Bishop of Mizigi and Auxiliary Bishop of the Archdiocese of Brisbane. He was consecrated as a bishop on 27 July 1995 by Archbishop John Alexius Bathersby.

During an address in 2000, Putney emphasised the primary purpose of the liturgy was adoration of God and not celebration of the community. He said the word "community" did not truly capture the Church's term "communion," which is a participation in the inner life of the Trinity, while the word "celebration" could be used in both a sacred and secular sense, and discernment was needed when applying it to the Sacred Liturgy.

On 24 January 2001, Putney was named bishop of the Roman Catholic Diocese of Townsville, succeeding Bishop Raymond Conway Benjamin. He was installed on 27 March 2001.

As bishop, he became well known for his ecumenical outreach to other Christian denominations and was president of the National Council of Churches in Australia from 2009 to 2013.

Putney was appointed Member of the Order of Australia in the 2013 Queen's Birthday Honours for "significant service to the Catholic Church in Australia, to the promotion of inter-faith dialogue, and to the community of Townsville", and his life and work is also remembered in the annual Bishop Michael Putney Lecture, sponsored by Queensland Churches Together and the Brisbane Roman Catholic Council for Ecumenism and Inter Religious Relations.

== Death ==
Putney was diagnosed with terminal stomach cancer in December 2012 and told he only had months to live, after spreading to his liver. He continued to work despite the diagnosis but was admitted to hospital on 21 March 201. He died 15 months after receiving his diagnosis at the Mater Hospital, Townsville, on 28 March 2014, aged 67.
