= Athelstan Beckwith =

Australian chemist

Professor Athelstan Beckwith AO FRS FAA

Professor of Organic Chemistry, Australian National University
- In office 1981–1995

Personal details
- Born: Athelstan Laurence Johnson Beckwith; 20 February 1930
- Died: 15 May 2010 (aged 80)

Athelstan Laurence Johnson Beckwith (20 February 1930 – 15 May 2010) was an Australian chemist. He was a fellow of the Australian Academy of Science.

== Life ==
He earned a BSc, from the University of Western Australia in 1952, and DPhil, from the University of Oxford in 1956. In 1960, he won the Rennie Memorial Medal. In 1961, he won a Nuffield Scholarship to study with Sir Derek Barton.

He taught at the University of Adelaide. He was Professor of Organic Chemistry at the Australian National University, from 1981 to 1995. In the 2004 Queen's Birthday Honours he was appointed an Officer of the Order of Australia for "service to science in the field of organic chemistry as a leading researcher and academic, and through the provision of advice to government and the wider community on scientific matters".

== Family ==
He was married; they had three children.
