= 2004 Queen's Birthday Honours (Australia) =

The 2004 Queen's Birthday Honours for Australia were announced on Monday 14 June 2004 by the Governor-General, Michael Jeffery.

The Birthday Honours were appointments by some of the 16 Commonwealth realms of Queen Elizabeth II to various orders and honours to reward and highlight good works by citizens of those countries. The Birthday Honours are awarded as part of the Queen's Official Birthday celebrations during the month of June.

== Order of Australia ==
=== Companion (AC) ===
==== General Division ====
Recipient	Citation	Notes
Professor Adele Chandler Green	For service to medical research through significant advances made in the field of the epidemiology of skin cancer and ovarian cancer, to public health including improved Indigenous health, and for leadership in the wider scientific community.	
The Honourable Justice John Dyson Heydon	For service to the law as eminent jurist, to the legal profession, and as an academic through extensive contributions to further legal knowledge and education in Australia.	
Sir Leo Arthur Hielscher	For service to economic growth and development, to business and finance, and to the community through strong support for major arts, cultural, sporting and charitable organisations.	
The Honourable Sir James Killen	For distinguished contributions to public life as a federal parliamentarian, barrister, author, orator and advocate for social justice and the rights of underprivileged members of the community.	
Professor Peter John Morris	For service to medical science as a surgeon and scientist in the areas of vascular surgery and renal transplants through developing tissue typing and testing of immunosuppression agents.	
Hugh Stretton	For service as a historian, social commentator and writer profoundly influencing and shaping ideas in the community on urban policy, town planning, and social and economic development.	
Nancy Wake	The award recognises the significant contribution and commitment of Nancy Wake, stemming from her outstanding actions in wartime, in encouraging community appreciation and understanding of the past sacrifices made by Australian men and women in times of conflict, and to a lasting legacy of peace.	

=== Officer (AO) ===
==== General Division ====
Recipient	Citation	Notes
Rabbi Raymond Apple	For service to the community through promoting inter-faith dialogue and harmony, to raising awareness of social justice, ethical and spiritual issues, and to the Jewish community.	
The Honourable Dr Lynn Maurice Arnold	For service to the community through the South Australian Parliament as Premier and through a range of portfolio responsibilities, and internationally through the development and humanitarian aid sectors.	
Associate Professor Rupert Leigh Atkinson	For service to medicine, particularly as a surgeon, academic, researcher and administrator in the field of neurosurgery and to the community through cultural organisations.	
Peter Tasman Bartels	For service to the community as a sports administrator, particularly in the areas of strategic and budgetary planning and sports development and promotion, and to the business sector.	
Emeritus Professor Athelstan Laurence Beckwith	For service to science in the field of organic chemistry as a leading researcher and academic, and through the provision of advice to government and the wider community on scientific matters.	
M Pamille Berg	For service to the community, particularly through the coordination and integration of visual arts and craft in public architectural projects, and by fostering the work of emerging and established artists in Australia and internationally, including Indigenous artists.	
Eva Besen	For service to the community, particularly as a benefactor and supporter of the arts, and through support for health and educational organisations.	
Joan Margaret Bielski	For service to the community, particularly through programs to encourage women's participation in political life and through continued contributions to the principles of equal opportunity, access to education and social reform.	
Jennifer Harley Blackman	For service to the law, particularly as a supporter of the advancement of women in the legal profession, and to the community through a range of church, youth and aged care organisations.	
Dr Denis Geoffrey Blight	For service to the community in the areas of international development aid, education and the applied biosciences.	
Dr Yvonne Ruth Burns	For service in the field of paediatric physiotherapy through teaching, clinical practice and research, and to the community through chaplaincy support roles.	
Michael Alfred Chaney	For service to the business sector through innovative leadership and management strategies, and to the community through involvement with and support for a broad range of artistic, cultural and scientific organisations.	
Dr Robert John Clements	For service to the Australian and international communities, particularly through agricultural research programs designed to assist in efforts to enable rural development, economic growth and self-sufficiency in food production in developing countries.	
Geoffrey Elliott Coles	For service to the community as a leading contributor to public health, library and information services, and sporting organisations.	
Dr Douglas Bruce Copeman	For service to veterinary science, particularly in the area of parasitology as a leading researcher, educator and administrator.	
Charles Peter Crittle	For service to Rugby Union football, particularly in the planning and hosting of the 2003 Rugby World Cup and as a player, coach and administrator.	
Michael Jenkins Crouch, AM	For service to the manufacturing sector, particularly in the areas of design, production efficiency and quality, to the development of export markets in the Asia-Pacific region, and to the community through a range of conservation and charitable organisations.	
Professor Peter Wray Cullen	For service to freshwater ecology, particularly in the areas of policy development, implementation and sustainability in relation to water and natural resource management, and to education.	
Professor James Langham Dale	For service as a leader in the field of agricultural biotechnology research and development, particularly plant virus resistance.	
Leonard Andrew Davis	For service to the mining industry, to the finance sector, and to the community through promoting corporate social responsibility in Australia.	
Richard Henwood Fidock	For service to the finance, business and management sectors, and to the community through heritage, cultural, service, youth and sporting organisations.	
Tamara Margaret Fraser	For service to the community through fostering the recognition and preservation of Australian artistic achievement, for initiating and promoting a range of activities to support people with disabilities, and for support of charitable, health and service groups.	
Heather Agnes Hewitt	For service to education through providing innovative leadership and administration in the university sector, and through research into and development of education programs for people with multiple disabilities.	
Alan Belford Jones	For service to the community as a supporter of and fundraiser for a wide range of not-for-profit organisations, to the media, and to sports administration.	
Wallace Macarthur King	For service to the Australian construction industry as a leader and innovator and through initiatives to develop the export of engineering services, particularly in the Asian region, and to the community through support for a range of educational, environmental, welfare and cultural organisations.	
Professor Stephen Ross Leeder	For service to medicine as an academic and administrator and to public health through research, education, policy development and advocacy of greater community awareness of environmental and lifestyle health issues.	
The Right Reverend Alistair Arthur Malcolm	For service to the community through the Anglican Church in Australia, particularly providing pastoral care to Indigenous communities, fostering relations between Aboriginal and Torres Strait Islander groups, and promoting reconciliation, ecumenism and education.	
Catherine McGowan	For service to the community through raising awareness of and stimulating debate about issues affecting women in regional, rural and remote areas.	
Bernadette Mary McMenamin	For service to the community, particularly through the development of programs in Australia and overseas designed to enhance the rights of children and to protect them from exploitation and abuse.	
Professor Frederick Arthur Mendelsohn	For service to medicine, particularly in the fields of neuroscience and biomedical research as a leading researcher, administrator and practitioner.	
Patricia Ann Miller	For service to the community as a significant contributor to debate on issues relating to native title, social justice, education, legal services, health and welfare, and the media.	
Neil Allan Mules	For service to international relations, particularly in the development and implementation of foreign policy and through advocacy of the role of Australian commercial and humanitarian interests in the future development of Iraq.	
The Honourable Justice Kemeri Ann Murray	For service to the law, to the administration of justice, and to the community, particularly in the areas of social development, welfare, multicultural affairs, education, health and the arts.	
Dr Brenda Mary Niall	For service to Australian literature as an academic, biographer and literary critic.	
Dr Helen Marion Nugent	For service to the performing arts, to business and the financial services industry, particularly in the area of corporate governance, and to the community.	
Professor Kerin O'Dea	For service in the areas of medical and nutrition research, to the development of public health policy, and to the community, particularly Indigenous Australians through research into chronic disease and prevention methods.	
John Anthony O'Neill	For service to Rugby Union football as an administrator, to the financial services sector, and to the community through a range of educational and charitable organisations.	
The Honourable Mahla Liane Pearlman	For service to the law and the judiciary, to the development of professional practice standards, and to the community.	
Mervyn John Phillips	For service to the community through advisory roles relating to the development and implementation of Australian foreign investment policy, to support for a range of educational, religious and charitable organisations, and to the business and finance sectors.	
The Honourable Margaret Elizabeth Reid	For service to the Australian Parliament, to support for parliamentary institutions in developing nations, and to the community through a wide range of volunteer and charitable organisations.	
Kenneth James Roche	For service to the development of the construction industry in Australia and a range of related professional organisations, to education, and to the community.	
Kerry Gaye Sanderson	For service to the development and management of the port and maritime industries in Australia, and to public sector governance in the areas of finance and transport in Western Australia.	
Professor Donald Allen Simpson	For service to medicine in the fields of neurosurgery and neurotrauma as a researcher and academic.	
Philip Spry-Bailey	For service to the community through the administration and delivery of health, aged care and social support services of the Catholic Church in Australia.	
Bert James Thiess	For service to civil engineering, particularly project management in relation to major undertakings in regional Queensland and to the community.	
The Honourable Mr Justice Peter Wolstenholme Young	For service to law and the administration of justice, to legal scholarship and to the community through the Anglican Church of Australia.	

==== Military Division ====
Branch	Recipient	Citation	Notes
Army	Major General Francis Xavier Roberts	For distinguished service to the Australian Defence Force in senior command and staff appointments.	

=== Member (AM) ===
==== General Division ====
Recipient	Citation	Notes
Professor Paul Andrew Arbon	For service to the community, particularly as Chief Commissioner of St John Ambulance Australia, and to nursing education and research.	
Geoffrey John Ashton	For service to business and industry, particularly through the development of policies to improve the competitiveness of Australian industry and in the area of vocational education and training.	
Frances Helen Awcock	For service to librarianship and to the community, particularly through redevelopment projects for the state libraries of Victoria and South Australia, the application of new technology and information systems, and the promotion of library and information services.	
Shirley Enid Ball	For service to the community, particularly in representing the interests of residents and negotiating with developers during complex urban redevelopments in historic areas of inner Sydney, and through the Darling House Aged Care Association.	
Professor Peter Mark Bartold	For service to the dental profession, particularly through periodontic education and research and the establishment of the Australian Periodontal Research Foundation.	
Professor Neil Leonard Baumgart	For service to educational research and development in Australia and to the advancement of educational programs in developing countries in the Asia-Pacific region.	
Emeritus Professor Paul August Baumgartner	For service to tertiary education and administration through the University of Western Sydney, to food science education and research, and to the community.	
Alfreda Betty Beaver	For service to the arts through promotion of Australian contemporary crafts, support for young and emerging craftspeople and the performing arts in Canberra.	
Ronald Kershaw Best	For service to the business sector through the promotion of effective management of corporate insurance and the development of risk management practice in Australia.	
Patricia Anne Boling	For service to youth, particularly through the Scouting movement and commitment to the creation of opportunities for the development of young people.	
John Guthrie Bowie	For service to education, particularly through the Jesuit Schools Board, the Association of Heads of Independent Girls' Schools and the Loyola Institute.	
Leslie Julius Brener	For service to the photographic/imaging industry, particularly through the establishment of a cohesive marketing, education and advisory association representing photographic retailers.	
Dr Margaret Nancy Brumby	For service to medical administration and management of biomedical research facilities, particularly the Walter and Eliza Hall Institute of Medical Research.	
Dr Joan Buchanan	For service to medicine and to the community, particularly in the area of aged care.	
Dr Grahame Murray Budd	For service to medicine, particularly human physiology and acclimatisation in extreme climatic conditions, and to scientific research in the Antarctic.	
Patricia Joan Burns	For service to the community, particularly through the Curran Foundation for St Vincent's Hospital and the Sacre Coeur Alumnae Association in Australia and internationally.	
Professor Brian Fowell Buxton	For service to medicine, particularly as an adviser on the development of cardiac surgery in Asia and through training programs for overseas surgeons.	
June Cameron	For service to youth, particularly through the Guiding movement and as a teacher of people with impaired hearing, and to the community.	
Bruce Alpin Campbell	For service to the community, particularly people living in rural, regional and outback Australia.	
Lewis Matthew Carroll	For service to Rugby Union football, particularly through contributions to the planning and hosting of the 2003 Rugby World Cup.	
John Austin Chapman, OBE CB DSO	In recognition of service to cricket administration, particularly through the New South Wales Cricket Association, and to community and sporting organisations.	
Oliver George Clark	For service to the gas industry, particularly through promoting natural gas as a clean and reliable energy source and the development of technical codes and standards, and to educational and community organisations.	
Dr Anthony Russell Clarkson	For service to renal medicine, particularly as a contributor to the advancement of the specialty of nephrology in the Asia-Pacific region through clinical research, teaching and professional organisations, and to the community.	
Steve George Condous	For service to the South Australian Parliament, to local government in Adelaide, and to the community through support for health, charitable, arts and sporting organisations.	
Judi Connelli	For service to the entertainment industry as a musical theatre and cabaret performer and as a recording artist and to the community through support for charitable organisations.	
Ronald Joseph Coote	For service to Rugby League football as an administrator and player and to the community, particularly through charitable organisations.	
Selwyn Harcourt Cornish	For service to senior secondary education in the Australian Capital Territory through the development and maintenance of system wide policy and standards in relation to curriculum, assessment and moderation.	
William Raymond Cossey	For service to public sector management in South Australia, to professional organisations, and to the community.	
Dr Paul Eugene Cotton	For service to medicine and to the community of the Northern Territory and Queensland through general practice and working to improving health standards and the sustainability of services in rural and remote areas.	
Frances Tonia Crampton	For service to sport through a range of organisations that promote sport in all areas of the community from amateur to elite levels.	
Eugene John Cullity	For service to the law and to the community, particularly through support for programs to rehabilitate juvenile offenders, and to Calvary Health Care Bethlehem.	
Dr Patrick Joseph Dalton	For service to the dental profession, particularly through the Australian Dental Association, and to the community of Griffith.	
Peter Eugene Daly	For service to the insurance industry and to the community, particularly through the advancement of alternative dispute resolution and consumer protection.	
Rowena Danziger	For service to education as Headmistress of Ascham School and through professional organisations, and to the community particularly through Opera Australia.	
John Francis Davies	For service to St John Ambulance Australia, and to the community through a range of health, church and educational organisations.	
Michael Charles Dillon	For service to the Australian film industry as a pioneer in adventure and mountain film cinematography, and to the community through support for international humanitarian work.	
Dr Barry John Duffy	For service to medicine as a paediatrician, particularly through the establishment of the Neonatal and Paediatric Emergency Transfer Service and the provision of paediatric services in rural and remote areas.	
Robert Stewart Dwyer	For service to Rugby Union football, particularly as a coach of New South Wales and Australian representative teams.	
Alan Lindsay Dyce	For service to science through research contributing to understanding of the taxonomy, biology and behaviour of a wide range of flies that affect native animals, livestock and humans.	
Nicholas Paul Enright	For service to the performing arts, particularly as a playwright, teacher, actor and director, and as a mentor of emerging talent.	
Morag Elizabeth Fraser	For service to journalism, particularly through Eureka Street magazine and the promotion of public debate on a range of social issues, and to the Melbourne Writers' Festival.	
Dr Henry George Gardiner	For service to agriculture, particularly through the provision of strategic leadership in rural and regional Australia and the development of agriculture in the Kimberley region.	
Major Genness Patricia Garven	For service to the community as a Brigade Chaplain for the New South Wales Fire Brigades, particularly through support for victims of fire and to the families of firefighters.	
Larry David George	For service to community relations in the South Pacific, particularly through the establishment and management of the Port Moresby City Mission.	
Colin Frederick Ging	For service to the building and construction industry, particularly through major building projects in Sydney including the Olympic Stadium project and its later reconfiguration.	
Andrew John Goledzinowski	For service to international relations, particularly through the mobilisation of international funding and other support activities in Iraq.	
George Musarurwa Gregan	For service to Rugby Union football, particularly as Captain of the Wallabies.	
Margaret Mary Gurry	For service to migrant children and their families through the establishment of the Friday Night School to provide assistance with school work and English language tuition.	
John Sydney Haines	For service to recreational boating, particularly as a boat designer and builder, to industry associations, and as a contributor to the development of national safety standards.	
Sheila Kennedy Hall	For service to the community through a range of health, housing and social welfare organisations and through the provision of counselling services.	
Dr Maria Patricia Harries	For service to the social work profession and to the community, particularly in the areas of mental health, child protection and education.	
Lyndall Maud Hendrickson	For service to music and to children with autism through the development of music and sound programs that facilitate speech development.	
Christopher David Henri	For service to the insurance industry by promoting standards of excellence in technical training and education and through the establishment of the Insurance Disaster Response Organisation.	
Brenton Leslie Higgins	For service to the dairy industry in South Australia through developing, managing and promoting dairy products, to people with intellectual disabilities, and to sport.	
Professor Joy Higgs	For service to health science education, particularly physiotherapy, through course development and research into teaching methods, and as an academic and administrator.	
Francis Kevin Hornby	For service to regional communities by promoting local government involvement with and support for the planning and implementation of social, cultural and community development programs.	
Professor John David Horowitz	For service to medicine and medical research in the field of cardiology, particularly in the area of ischaemic heart disease.	
Professor Alfred Shin Huang	For service to local government, to business and commerce through the promotion and facilitation of education and trade opportunities between Adelaide and the South East Asian region, and to the community through civic, multicultural and social welfare initiatives.	
Dr Graham Neville Hughes	For service to the community, particularly through promoting research in the areas of motor accident, road safety trauma and rehabilitation, and to public administration in insurance and workers compensation.	
Terry Roy Jackson	For service to the community as a benefactor to a range of church and social welfare groups, and to the development of international business opportunities.	
Jolyn Margaret Karaolis	For service to education through St Catherine's School, Waverley as an innovator and administrator, and through the activities of the Australian Heads of Independent Schools Association.	
Professor Andrew Henry Kaye	For service as a neurosurgeon, particularly in the field of brain tumour therapy, and as a researcher and academic leader.	
Dr Elizabeth Anne Kernohan	For service to the New South Wales Parliament, to local government, and to the community of the Camden region through a range of service, youth, rural show, education and arts groups.	
Emeritus Professor Alexander McBride Kerr	For service to industry, commerce and finance in Western Australia, to the development of the study of urban and regional economics in Australia, and to the community.	
Professor Eleanor Joan Kerr	For service to education and to the arts, particularly through research in the fields of architecture and art history, and through encouraging the study and recognition of Australian women artists.	
Brian Newton King	For service to people with vision impairments through the Lions Eye Institute, to people with intellectual disabilities, and to the insurance industry.	
Darrell Nairn Kraehenbuehl	For service to botany, to nature conservation, and to the research and recording of Australia's botanical history.	
Phoebe Marie Lally	For service to women in rural and regional communities, particularly in the areas of health and education, and to the community of Lock through church, arts and youth groups.	
Grant Frederick Latta	For service to business, particularly through the food processing and grain industries.	
Jeffrey Maxwell Lawrence	For service to the community through the programs of Lions Clubs International, particularly the establishment and governance of the Lions Eye Bank.	
John Angus Mackay	For service to the community through the management and administration of major public utility services in the Australian Capital Territory and through contributions to a range of health care, social welfare, cultural and sporting organisations.	
Geoffrey James Martin	For service to primary industry through the research and breeding of pasture grass species, and to the environment through the Launceston Field Naturalists Club.	
Hunter Donald Maskey	For service to the Australian meat industry, particularly in the areas of education, training and apprenticeships, and through support for and promotion of the retail meat sector.	
Dr Clifton Murray Maxwell	For service to medicine as a surgeon and as a contributor to the establishment of orthopaedic training in Australia, and as a benefactor for biomechanical research.	
John Norman McDonald	For service to sport, particularly Rugby League football as an administrator, and to the community.	
Dr John Malcolm McIntyre	For service to dentistry, particularly in the areas of education and research and by developing dental health programs in the Asia Pacific region, and to the community.	
Ross Malcolm McLean	For service to the community as a contributor to policy development and implementation of services in the disability, children's and aged care sectors, to business, particularly the development of trading opportunities, and to sport as an administrator.	
Lieutenant Colonel Andrew Peter McMartin	For exceptional performance in the field of operational logistics, particularly in the fields of contract assessment and through his role in the development of the Joint Operational Logistics Tool suite for the Deployable Joint Force Headquarters.	
Emeritus Professor John Vincent Megaw	For service to archaeology and art history as an educator, researcher and writer, particularly in the areas of European Iron Age art, contemporary Indigenous Australian art and music archaeology.	
James Raymond Michell	For service to the business sector, particularly furthering recognition of family businesses, and to the community.	
The Reverend Father Kevin Melville Mogg	For service to the community, particularly as the founder of an integrated welfare delivery agency, Catholic Social Services Victoria, and as a prison chaplain.	
Professor David Allan Myers	For service to Australian literature, particularly through the publication and promotion of regional authors, and to the recording of outback history.	
Francis Greig Nissen	For service to the pineapple industry as a grower, through processing plant management and restructuring, and the development of new products and marketing strategies, and to the community.	
Emeritus Scientia Professor Patrick James O'Farrell	For service to education as an academic, researcher and administrator, particularly in the field of Irish history and its contribution to Australian society and culture.	
Marjorie Blanche O'Keeffe	For service to the community through the Queen Elizabeth ll Jubilee Hospital Auxiliary, particularly through the establishment and management of an organisation dedicated to raising funds for medical equipment.	
Albert Mervyn Olsen	For service to the fishing industry in South Australia through the development and implementation of innovative policies to manage and protect the marine environment.	
Keith William Orchison	For service to the petroleum and electricity industries, particularly through fostering cooperation between energy producers and government agencies and through the development of policies to benefit Australia in the long term.	
Lynette Louise Palmen	For service to the community, particularly through promoting public awareness of existing and emerging issues affecting women, and in providing expertise to a range of charitable and not-for-profit organisations.	
John Brian Parry	For service to the community through a range of organisations, particularly the Metropolitan Fire and Emergency Services Board.	
Nigel Hugh Peck	For service to the electrical industry as a business leader and a contributor to the development of the sector as a mentor and promoter of training programs, and to the community.	
Christopher Brian Peters	For service to the business sector as an administrator of a range of private, public and professional authorities and organisations, and to the community.	
Kathleen Anne Phelan	For service to education through the development of policies and programs in the public, private and tertiary sectors, and as an advocate for the independent school sector.	
Anthony John Pickering	For service to the real estate industry, and to the community of the Northern Territory through philanthropic support for a range of service, sporting and charitable organisations.	
James Ross Pollock	For service to the forestry industry as a contributor to the sustainable growth of the sector through the development and implementation of government policies.	
Dr Noel William Preston	For service to the community by raising public awareness of issues involving public sector ethics and governance, as an advocate for accountability and reforms, and as an academic and researcher in the field.	
Kerry Patrick Prior	For service to community health, particularly as a contributor to the administration of, and as a fundraiser for, the Royal Children's Hospital and Foundation.	
Margaret Elizabeth Ray	For service to the community through a range of health, welfare and charitable organisations, to people with intellectual disabilities, and to the Victorian Parliament.	
Ernest Francis Razborsek	For service to industrial relations, to employee welfare and safety, and to vocational training, particularly in the Hunter region of New South Wales, and to the community.	
Professor Harry Frederick Recher	For service to ecological science, particularly through the development of ecosystem management in Australia, and as an educator, author and advocate for biodiversity.	
Dr Helen Margaret Reid	For service to the community through a range of health, civic and welfare organisations, and to education, particularly through participation in the administration of secondary and tertiary institutions.	
Kenneth John Rennie	For service to the community, particularly as a contributor of technical and advisory assistance to educational institutions and the building industry, and to the business sector as an accountant.	
Nicholas Edwin Renton	For service to the insurance and securities industries, particularly as an author on investment and to the community as a contributor to the development of shareholder organisations.	
Dr Michael Scollin Rice	For service to medicine, particularly paediatrics in the fields of oncology and haematology, to a range of professional and medical organisations, and to the community.	
Derek James Robson	For service to the community, particularly as National Secretary of the Returned and Services League of Australia.	
The Reverend Father Luciano Camillo Rocchi	For service to the Italian community through the assistance provided to migrant families on arrival in Australia, and the pastoral care services of the Catholic Church.	
Allan John Rogers	For service to the community, particularly through the provision of rehabilitation services for people affected by drug, alcohol and gambling addictions, and to the environment.	
Wendy Rose	For service to the development of humanitarian aid programs, both nationally and internationally, particularly in relation to issues affecting women and children.	
Trevor Cyril Rowe	For service to the investment banking sector and as a contributor to the formulation of public policy, to higher education, and to the community.	
Gladstone Ronald Russell	For service to engineering, particularly through the advancement and promotion of engineering apprenticeships and vocational training, and to the community of the Hunter region.	
John William Ryan	For service to primary industry, particularly through the innovative design and development of specialist agricultural equipment, and the promotion of environmentally sustainable cropping and soil management practices.	
Professor Deborah Claire Saltman	For service to medicine as an educator, researcher and author, particularly in relation to women's health issues, the education of general practitioners and the advancement of family medicine.	
Meredyth Tenison Sarah	For service to the community of St Peters Collegiate Girls' School, particularly through leadership during changes to the system of governance, and through fundraising for improved facilities and programs.	
Marcus Ferdinand Schoenheimer	For service to manufacturing and to industry, particularly through innovative design and development of water heater valves, the advancement of safety standards, and to the Jewish community.	
Carol Jean Schofield	For service to primary industry, particularly as a significant contributor to organisations involved in the promotion and development of the South Australian agriculture and aquaculture industries.	
Brian Martin Schwartz	For service to business and commerce, particularly in the field of accountancy, and to the community through support for and development of sporting, educational, cultural and charitable organisations.	
Robert Ian Sewell	For service to the Australian grain industry through a range of industry organisations, particularly the Grain Pool of Western Australia, and through international promotion and marketing activities.	
Professor Gregory John Seymour	For service to dentistry, particularly through periodontology and immunology research, and to dental and oral health education and administration.	
Bernard Edward Shepherd	For service to education in the Western Sydney region, particularly through the development of secondary and tertiary educational opportunities for young people, and participation in professional educational organisations.	
Brian Michael Sherman	For service to the community as a philanthropist and benefactor to a range of arts, education, and sporting organisations, and to business and commerce.	
Robyn Helen Shields	For service to nursing, particularly through the establishment of Indigenous mental health services and training programs for workers in this area.	
Lawrence Sidney Smith	For service to landscape architecture, particularly in the development of major Australian botanic gardens through contributions to professional and community organisations.	
Raymond John Stanley	For service to the Reserve Forces, particularly through the Defence Reserve Support Council, and to science education as a teacher and author of chemistry textbooks for senior secondary students.	
Dr John Hedley Summons	For service to medicine, particularly the advancement of medical education through the Royal Australian College of General Practitioners.	
Dr Richard Frederick Swindell	For service to education, particularly through the University of the Third Age and the development of U3A Online, and through the training of primary school teachers.	
Clifford Harry Thompson	For service to soil science as a researcher and educator, and as an advisor in land management practices and conservation issues.	
Robert Allan Tuckey	For service to Rugby Union football, particularly through the planning and hosting of the 2003 Rugby World Cup.	
The Reverend Father Keith Alexander Turnbull	For service to the community, particularly through the establishment of aged care, rehabilitation, refuge and respite services, and to the Catholic Church.	
Richard Wallace Turner	For service to the community as a board member and fundraiser for the Smith Family and the Pain Management and Research Centre.	
Adjunct Professor Richard John Vaughan	For service to medicine, particularly in the field of spinal surgery, to pain management, and to medical education and training.	
Professor Mark Sebastian Wainwright	For service to chemical engineering as a researcher and academic, and to tertiary education.	
The Reverend Doctor Thomas Raymond Wallace	For service to education, particularly in the Anglican school system, in the area of curriculum development and sociological values and ethics.	
Professor Trevor Clifton Waring	For service to psychology, particularly through the advancement of mental health research and support services, to education, and to the community.	
Alex Bernard Watson	For service to biomedical engineering, particularly through the development of Australian and International standards governing medical equipment and electrical safety in hospitals.	
Robert Fraser Weir	For service to the honey industry, to the development of sustainable agricultural practices and natural resource management, and to the community of Glen Innes.	
Roderick Ian West	For service to state and independent schools in Australia, particularly in the areas of curriculum development and administration, to Trinity Grammar School as Headmaster, and to the community.	
Dr Lyle Dudley Whan	For service to education through leadership in the South West Metropolitan Region of Sydney, particularly as a primary school principal and administrator, and through participation in a range of professional educational organisations.	
Professor Richard Thomas White	For service as a leader in educational research, and to tertiary education.	
Bin Jun Zhuag	For service to the furtherance of Australia's relations and trade with the People's Republic of China, particularly through involvement in processes leading to the export of liquefied natural gas to Guangdong Province, China.	

==== Military Division ====
Branch	Recipient	Citation	Notes
Navy	Commodore Paul Farnsworth Greenfield	For exceptional service to the Royal Australian Navy as Submarine Project Director, Director General Undersea Warfare Systems and as Director General Maritime Development.	
Navy	Rear Admiral Rowan Carlisle Moffitt	For exceptional service to the Royal Australian Navy and the Australian Defence Force as the Director General Navy Capability Performance and Plans, Commandant of the Australian Defence Force Warfare Centre and as Deputy Chief of Navy.	
Army	Colonel John Richard Beckwith	For exceptional service in the field of military law, particularly in his role as Judge Advocate and Defence Force Magistrate.	
Army	Brigadier Michael Fairweather	For exceptional service to the Australian Defence Force in senior command and staff appointments, particularly as Colonel Reserve at the Royal Military College, Duntroon and Army National Commander, Australian Army Cadets.	
Army	Colonel John James Frewen	For exceptional performance during operations as the Commander of Combined Joint Task Force 635 during Operation ANODE from July to November 2003.	
Army	Brigadier Ian Ross Lillie	For exceptional service to the Australian Army as Head of Corps, the Royal Australian Army Ordnance Corps and Commander of Operation BEL ISI, Bougainville.	
Army	Lieutenant Colonel Simon Roach	For exceptional service as the Staff Officer Grade One Plans at Deployable Joint Force Headquarters (Land) and as the Commanding Officer of the 1st Field Regiment.	
Army	Colonel Philip Shane Smith	For exceptional service as Staff Officer Grade One Aviation, Land Headquarters, Commanding Officer, 1st Aviation Regiment and Deputy Commander, 16th Brigade (Aviation).	
Army	Brigadier George Yacoub	For exceptional service to the Australian Defence Force in the field of project management and systems management of explosive ordnance.	
Air Force	Air Commodore Graham Mitchell Bentley	For exceptional performance in the conduct of warlike operations as the Commander Joint Task Force 633 and the Australian National Headquarters Middle East Area of Operations during Operations FALCONER and CATALYST.	
Air Force	Warrant Officer Peter Michael Hall	For exceptional service in the field of Airmen leadership and trade training and enhancing engineering quality standards.	

=== Medal (OAM) ===
==== General Division ====
Recipient	Citation	Notes
Dr James Neil Adamson	For service to the community, particularly through the Rotary International Literacy Programme.	
Raymond Howard Agland	For service to the community of Kempsey, particularly through a range of surf lifesaving, sporting and service organisations.	
Raymond George Agnew	For service to local government and to the community of Yorke Peninsula.	
Sister Michaeleen Mary Ahern	For service to the community through project planning, development and administration of the Mater Misericordiae Hospitals in Brisbane.	
Mohammed Aziz Akbar	For service to the community, particularly through the Ethnic Communities Council of New South Wales.	
Donald Campbell Allan	For service to the community of Canberra, particularly people with disabilities.	
Robert James Allen	For service to Rugby League football as an administrator, particularly through development of the code in the New South Wales Central Coast area.	
Wilfred Patrick Amarant	For service to the community and to local government in the Borough of Koroit.	
Anonymous	For service to the community, particularly as a pastoral care worker with the Launceston Uniting Church.	
Anonymous	For service to the community, particularly through the Noosa Federation of the Arts.	
Anonymous	For service to the community through a range of business, sporting, and charitable organisations.	
Emeritus Professor Colin James Apelt	For service to the community, particularly through Mater Health Services and the Innocents Relief Association.	
George Robert Apps	For service to the community of Mount Isa through a range of organisations assisting the ageing and people with disabilities.	
Christopher Keith Arnott	For service to the community, particularly through the Royal Institute for Deaf and Blind Children and the Asthma Foundation of New South Wales.	
Colin Francis Arthur	For service to the community, particularly through the Asbestos Victims Association of South Australia.	
Alan Ross Baird	For service to people with intellectual disabilities and to the community through service and aged care organisations.	
Ephraim Bani	For service to the community, particularly through the promotion and preservation of Torres Strait Islander culture and languages.	
Doris Mary Banks	For service to the community through a range of aged care, educational, church and craft organisations.	
Sandra Bardas	For service to the community through programs supporting Indigenous youth and education and through a range of cultural and health organisations.	
Victor Raphael Barouch	For service to the textile industry in South Australia.	
Brian Darnton Bayston	For service to the community through a range of religious and educational organisations, particularly the Presbyterian Church of Victoria.	
Lillian May Beard	For service to youth through the Scouting and Guiding movements.	
Richard Frederick Bell	For service to the welfare of veterans and their families.	
Edwin William Bennett	For service to people with disabilities, particularly through the Paraplegic-Quadriplegic Association of Western Australia.	
Brother Brian Anthony Berg	For service to youth through educational and sports programs, to young people at risk, and to religion as a member of the Christian Brothers religious order.	
Kevin Colin Berryman	For service to veterans and their families in the Australian Capital Territory.	
Margaret Anne Bevan	For service to community health and nursing, particularly through cardiac rehabilitation programs.	
Kenneth Charles Birch	For service to the Indigenous community of Western Australia through the Churches of Christ.	
Shirley Anne Birch	For service to the Indigenous community of Western Australia through the Churches of Christ.	
Raymond James Birchell	For service to amateur boxing administration and training.	
Philip Howard Birt	For service to local government and the community of the Tambellup Shire, and to lawn bowls.	
Thomas James Blair	For service to people with visual impairments, particularly through the development of orientation and mobility training programs in Australia and Asia and the Guide Dog movement.	
Catherine Ann Boaden	For service to nursing and to Pacific Island communities, particularly through Interplast Australia.	
Jean Lesley Boag	For service to tennis in the Australian Capital Territory as an administrator and competitor.	
Iris Maude Bonshore	For service to Indigenous education, particularly through the development of specialised training and support programs.	
Joan Audrey Bourke	For service to the welfare of veterans and their families, particularly through the Deloraine Sub-Branch of the Returned and Services League of Australia.	
Thomas Walter Bowden	For service to the poultry industry and to the community of McLaren Flat.	
Nance Brennan	For service to the community through music teaching.	
Beverley Douglas-Scott Briese	For service to the community, particularly through fundraising for Austin Health.	
Ronald Rupert Bromley	For service to the community through a range of organisations, particularly Lions International.	
Geoffrey Spencer Brown	For facilitating liaison between Qantas Airways and Australian government agencies in the evacuation of Australians from Bali and the repatriation of the remains of victims following the bombings which occurred on 12 October 2002.	
Howard William Brown	For service to the community through the Victims of Crime Assistance League (VOCAL).	
Joseph Dennis Brown	For service to heritage conservation and the environment in the Berrima region.	
Lois Dawn Buchanan	For service to youth through the Scouting movement.	
Lincoln Edwin Burchett	For service to veterans and their families through the 2/14 Australian Field Regiment Association.	
Leonie Ann Burgess	For service to the community, particularly through the Wollongong Nursing Home.	
Iris Burgoyne	For service to the Indigenous community of South Australia, particularly as a historian of the Mirning people and through the Port Lincoln Aboriginal Health Service.	
Ronald Kenneth Burling	For service to the community of the Gold Coast through a range of educational, professional and not-for-profit organisations.	
Commander Peter James Burn RAN	For service to veterans and their families, particularly through the Naval Association of Australia.	
Graham Stephen Burstow	For service to photography through administrative roles with photographic associations and as an exhibitor and curator.	
The Reverend Father Henry James Byrne	For service to the Catholic Church and to the community of Batemans Bay, particularly in the areas of education and aged care.	
James Patrick Byrne	For service to local government and to the community of Far North Queensland.	
John Joseph Byrne	For service to the community of Bundaberg, particularly in the areas of aged care and health services.	
Lynette Elizabeth Byrne	For service to people with disabilities and their families, particularly through the Spina Bifida Association of Tasmania.	
Patrick Leonard Byrne	For service to people with disabilities and their families, particularly through the Spina Bifida Association of Tasmania.	
Kevin Vincent Cahill	For service to the agricultural show movement, particularly through the Royal Agricultural Society of Western Australia, and to the community of Merredin.	
Anne Penrose Cain	For service to youth through the Guiding movement, and to people with disabilities.	
Michael Adair Campbell	For service to conservation and the environment through a range of organisations in the Central Coast area.	
Luigi Antonio Campolongo	For service to local government and to the Italian community.	
Felix Cappy	For service to the community of Castlemaine.	
Robert Murray Carraill	For service to agricultural science, particularly in the areas of animal production and natural resource management, and to the community.	
Dr Constantine Castan	For service to the Greek community through a range of social, cultural and educational organisations.	
Dr Darrel Norman Caulley	For service to education in the fields of qualitative research and evaluation methodology, and to the community.	
Trevor George Challen	For service to the community in Tasmania, particularly through Camp Quality and the Royal Automobile Club of Tasmania.	
Dr Keith Paul Charlton	For service through the provision of immediate medical assistance to the victims of the bombings which occurred in Bali on 12 October 2002.	
Jeffery James Cheetham	For service to business and commerce through the development, production and export of innovative dental products.	
Christine Elizabeth Chilcott	For service to the communities of Deloraine and Meander, particularly through aged care and sporting organisations.	
Jane M. P. Childs	For service to music as a mentor and promoter of emerging composers and performers through the Songwriters, Composers And Lyricists Association (SCALA).	
Robert Norman Childs	For service to music as a mentor and promoter of emerging composers and performers through the Songwriters, Composers and Lyricists Association (SCALA).	
John Joseph Clark	For service to the Indigenous community through a range of organisations in the Taree area.	
Ronald Edward Clarke	For service to the community in Tasmania, particularly older citizens through information technology training and support services.	
Eric Morris Cohen	For service to the Jewish community of Melbourne and to the accounting profession.	
Ross Wallace Collings	For service to the sport of wrestling through administrative and coaching roles.	
Ross Montague Collins	For service to the community of Upper Gascoyne through local government and agricultural organisations.	
Moya Valerie Condon	For service to women and families through pregnancy counselling and support services.	
Michael Anthony Conway	For service to the community through the Leader Food for Families Appeal.	
Dr Robert Edward Cottam	For service to primary industry through animal health management and the study and promotion of sustainable grazing techniques in semi arid regions.	
Susan Louise Crawford	For service to the community, particularly through organisations for mental health care.	
Ailsa Joyce Crooke	For service to the community as a volunteer guide and researcher with the Australian War Memorial.	
Edwin Adrian Crouch	For service to basketball as a referee and an administrator.	
Gerald Leon Crown	For service to children's charities through the fundraising programs of the Australian Toy Association.	
Judith Anne Cubitt	For service to equestrian sport as a dressage judge and administrator, and to people with disabilities, particularly through the Riding for the Disabled Association of Australia.	
Graeme Kinross Cumbrae-Stewart	For service to the community, particularly through the Scouting movement, and to the development and promotion of tennis.	
Peter Dale Daffen	For service to cricket as an administrator and as a supporter of young players, and to the community through juvenile justice and Indigenous assistance programs.	
Russell Lloyd Darnley	For service through the provision of assistance to victims and their families following the bombings in Bali on 12 October 2002, and through the provision of interpreting services for Australian officials.	
Dorothy Anne Dashwood	For service to the community through a range of health, cultural and church organisations.	
Vincent Graham De Luca	For service to the community, particularly through youth welfare and sporting organisations.	
Petera Emma de Wolf	For service to the community, particularly through the Travellers Aid Society of Victoria.	
Joan Dean	For service to athletes with disabilities, particularly through the Special Olympics movement.	
Arthur William Deutrom	For service to the community, particularly through the Sri Lanka Cricket Foundation of Queensland and the Princess Alexandra Hospital Foundation.	
The Reverend Judith Claire Dewar	For service to the community of Rockhampton, particularly through the Anglican Church.	
Brian Edward Dixon	For service to the Indigenous community, particularly in the areas of health care and housing, and through the development of training programs for Aboriginal health workers.	
Susan Patricia Donoghoe	For service to sport, particularly rowing as an administrator, coach and competitor, and to physical education.	
James Patrick Dooley	For service to the community through a range of organisations, particularly the agricultural show movement.	
Margaret Ethel Doueal	For service to squash, particularly as a competitor, and to the community of the Mornington Peninsula.	
Flora Elizabeth Douglas	For service to the community through the Vision Australia Foundation.	
Valmai Nellie Douglas	For service to the community of Hurstville, particularly through the Georges River Community Service organisation and the Oatley Flora and Fauna Conservation Society.	
Marie Doreen Ducat	For service to the community of Hobart through a range of organisations, particularly Meals on Wheels.	
Nancy Lillian Duckmanton	For service to the community of Moorabbin, particularly through the Moorabbin Hospital Ladies Auxiliary.	
Helen Mary Dullard	For service to the community through a range of organisations, particularly the Hills Community Support Group.	
James Lavington Dunn	For service to the development of equestrian sports in Australia and at Olympic level as a coach, manager, administrator and judge.	
Emeritus Professor Kenneth Raymond Dutton	For service to tertiary education as an academic, scholar and administrator and through the study of the French language and literature.	
Gordon William Duxbury	For service to visually impaired people through the guide dog association and to the community, particularly through the programs of Rotary International and Apex.	
Desmond James Dwyer	For service to the community of Caloundra, particularly through the surf life saving movement, and to local government.	
Elizabeth Joy Dymmott	For service to the community in South Australia, particularly through programs to raise public awareness of the issues concerning substance abuse.	
Janet Elizabeth Earnshaw	For service to people with intellectual disabilities through the Endeavour Foundation.	
Jane Marion Edmanson	For service to horticulture, particularly through the promotion of environmentally sustainable gardening practices, and the encouragement and education of young gardeners.	
Irene Edwards	For service to the community of Narembeen through a range of organisations, particularly sporting groups.	
Captain Kenneth Frederick Edwards	For service to the maritime industry through the development of sail training accreditation courses in Australia, to youth, and to the preservation of sailing ships.	
Marjory Norman Edwards	For service to the community, particularly through financial support for a range of medical research, educational and cultural organisations.	
Dr Robert Murray Edwards	For service through the provision of medical assistance to the victims of the bombings which occurred in Bali on 12 October 2002.	
Allan George Eldridge	For service to the community through a range of organisations and as a foster parent.	
Nancy Eldridge	For service to the community through a range of organisations and as a foster parent.	
Jean Mary Errington	For service to the community, particularly through the Association of Relatives and Friends of the Emotionally and Mentally Ill.	
John Lister Evans	For service to the environment, particularly in the areas of bush conservation and regeneration and wildlife protection.	
Anne Margaret Fahey	For service to the dental profession, particularly through the Dental Assistants Association of New South Wales.	
Peter Fairs	For service to the community, particularly through the Mental Illness Fellowship of South Australia.	
Muriel Rosemary Farrington	For service to the community through the programs of the Open House Christian Involvement Centre.	
Jillian Baldwin Fearon	For service to the community through a range of organisations, particularly the Southern Peninsula Community Support and Information Centre Inc.	
Andrew Sage Ferry	For service to the community, particularly as a supporter of and benefactor to the Ballarat Fine Art Gallery and the Sovereign Hill Museums Association.	
Robin Frances Ferry	For service to the community, particularly as a supporter of and benefactor to the Ballarat Fine Art Gallery and the Sovereign Hill Museums Association.	
Ronald James Finneran	For service to sport for people with disabilities as an administrator and competitor.	
Margery Eva Flowers	For service to the community as a foster carer.	
Elaine Lillian Forward	For service to the sport of clay target shooting as an administrator, official and judge.	
Harold Michael Foulkes-Taylor	For service to local government and to the community of Murchison.	
Maurice Kenworthy Francis	For service to the communities of Yunta, Manna Hill and Olary, particularly through the Outback Areas Community Development Trust.	
Brian Francis Freedman	For service to cricket, particularly as an administrator.	
Glenice Barbara Freeman	For service to the community of Maroondah City, particularly through health and aged care organisations.	
Peter Edward Freney	For service to swimming in the Australian Capital Territory and surrounding districts, particularly through the Telopea Swim Club.	
Raymond Leslie Gallagher	For service to the community through music, particularly as the founder, conductor and director of brass and concert bands.	
Mervyn Alfred Genrich	For service to the community of Redlands, particularly through local government and service organisations.	
Anthony John Gibson	For service to optometry, particularly through the Eye Clinic at Royal Melbourne Hospital, and to the community of Park Orchards.	
Kenneth David Gillanders	For service to horticulture through the introduction and propagation of rare and exotic plants, and to the Australian Rhododendron Society.	
Claire Patricia Givney	For service to the community, particularly through the Australian Jesuit Mission in India.	
William Henderson Glen	For service to the Anglican Church of Australia, particularly through the Anglican Defence Force Board and as a Diocesan legal counsel.	
Norman Maxwell Godbee	For service to the surf lifesaving movement, particularly through the Yamba Surf Life Saving Club, and to the community of Grafton.	
Jillian Ann Golley	For service to the preservation of the history of Holdfast Bay, particularly through the Brighton Historical Society and the Holdfast Bay History Centre.	
Paul Warren Gooding	For service to the community through Diabetes Australia and the National Diabetes Services Scheme.	
Councillor Patricia Ann Gould	For service to local government and to the community of Albury.	
Kostadinos Andreas Gouriotis	For service to the community, particularly through the Casula Powerhouse Arts Centre and the Liverpool Regional Museum.	
Joan Lawton Graham	For service to people with disabilities, particularly through the provision of accommodation and employment opportunities, and to aged care.	
Robert Victor Grant	For service to the Army Reserve and to the 21 Construction Regiment Association.	
Eileen Lois Green	For service to the community of the Coal River Valley through historical, aged care and youth groups.	
Paul Raymond Greenaway	For service to the visual arts as a curator and by promoting emerging talent and Australian artists.	
Beryl Elizabeth Gregory	For service to education and to the community, particularly through the Anglican counselling and guidance agency, Lifeworks.	
John Robert Griffin	For service to cycling, as a competitor and administrator, and to the community of Inverell.	
Wilfred Patrick Griffin	For service to the communities of Lilydale and Karoola, particularly through the Lilydale Progress Association and the Karoola Football Club.	
Scott Clifford Grimley	For service to the community, particularly through Lifeline Australia.	
Kenneth David Grinham	For service to people with disabilities and to sports administration, particularly through the New South Wales Sports Council for the Disabled.	
Margaret Alice Gundry	For service to the community of the Bellingen district through aged, health care and sporting organisations.	
Brother James Ernest Hamilton	For service to the education and welfare of young people at Boys Town and in the community of Engadine as a member of the Order of the Salesians of Don Bosco.	
Peter Northall Harris	For service to youth, particularly through the Scouting movement, and to education.	
Arthur Harrison	For service to the welfare of veterans and their families.	
Professor Robin Hawthorn	For service to dentistry, particularly in the field of prosthodontics as a practitioner and an academic.	
Robert Bryce Hayes-Thompson BEM	For service to the Royal Agricultural Society of Western Australia, to local government and to the communities of Merredin and Kellerberrin, particularly in the areas of health and aged care.	
Diana Rosemary Hazard	For service to the community, particularly through the New South Wales Branch of the National Trust of Australia.	
Edwin Richard Hazeldene	For service to the community of Bendigo, particularly as a supporter of the Bendigo Radiotherapy Centre.	
Albert Charles Hearn	For service to the community, particularly the promotion of safety and security through Neighbourhood Watch Tasmania, and through health, sporting and musical organisations.	
Terry Vaudan Heggaton	For service to the sheep and cattle industries in Tasmania, and to the community of Launceston.	
William Ernest Hendy	For service to the community, particularly through Lions International.	
Robert Hetherington	For service to the community, particularly through the Schizophrenia Fellowship, and to the Western Australian Parliament.	
Janet Marion Hiley	For service to the community through the Guiding movement and organisations including the former Annerley Community Care Centre.	
Cecily Faith Hoare	For service to the community of Port Macquarie.	
Dr Simon John Hockley	For service through the provision of medical assistance to the victims of the bombings which occurred in Bali on 12 October 2002.	
Warren Stanley Holt	For service to youth, particularly through the programs of Triple Care Farm, and to the community of the Southern Highlands.	
Maxwell Ferris Horton	For service to the community, particularly through the Anglican Church of Australia, and to tennis as an administrator.	
James Joseph Houlahan	For service to the horse racing industry, particularly as a trainer, and to the community.	
Robert John Howard	For service to the community of Hay, particularly through the Hay Football Club.	
May Beatrice Hudson	For service to the community, particularly through the Country Women's Association of New South Wales.	
Peter James Huggett	For service to rowing as a manager, official and administrator.	
John Caradoc Hughes	For service to the community, particularly through Lions Clubs International, and to youth.	
Peter Bruce Hughes	For service to veterans and their families and to the community of Kerang.	
Alex Hutt	For service to athletics as an administrator and to the community through the Rotary Club of Cronulla.	
Danielle Jane Hyndes	For service to the community of the Australian Capital Territory through support for the activities of heritage, cultural, medical research and social welfare organisations.	
Dr Hilton Immerman	For service to the Jewish community, particularly through adult education and youth leadership programs.	
Helen Bessie James	For service to the community, particularly through Soroptimist International, heritage organisations and the Women's and Children's Hospital.	
Dr Ronald Harris Jarvis	For service to medicine as a general practitioner and to the community in the Penola district.	
John Percival Jennings	For service to the community of Loxton Waikerie through a range of cultural, service, sporting and civic organisations, and to primary industry.	
The Hon. John Hughes Jobling	For service to the New South Wales Parliament and to the community of the Muswellbrook Shire.	
Evelyn Gertrude Johncock	For service to the Indigenous community of Port Lincoln, particularly through women's, youth and sporting groups.	
Patricia Mary Johnson	For service to the community, particularly through music as an orchestral director, and through fundraising activities for local health and aged care facilities.	
Beth Olive Johnstone	For service to the community, particularly through Lifeline as an administrator, supervisor and counsellor.	
Brian Henry Kahlefeldt	For service to international relations through humanitarian endeavours in Sri Lanka, and to the community through support for health care and other organisations, particularly in the Riverina area.	
Fay Maree Kairn	For service to the community through providing accountancy services for not-for-profit organisations and through the activities of Zonta International and the Australian Federation of Business and Professional Women.	
Thomas John Keleman	For service to the Jewish community, particularly through B'nai B'rith and Jewish Care.	
James Cousley Kelso	For service to the community through a range of motor sport, vintage car and educational organisations.	
Margaret Anne Kilby	For service to the community as a financial counsellor, particularly through the Ryde Eastwood Financial Counselling Service and the Christian Community Aid Service.	
Marlene Jean Kindler	For service to the community as an administrator with the South Australian Association of State School Organisations.	
John Cecil King	For service to local government in rural Queensland.	
Mavis Jean King	For service to the community, particularly through the Country Women's Association of Western Australia.	
Harold Burchill Kirkpatrick	For service to the community of Berowra Waters through the Berowra Waters Progress Association.	
Anthony David Kosky	For service to the development of Australian business links with China, and to the community through the Rotary Club of Melbourne.	
Thi Duyen Lam	For service to the community through the establishment of the Vietnamese Parents with Disabled Children Support Group in New South Wales.	
Peter Shepherdson Lane	For service to the printing industry, particularly the integration of information technology into conventional print technologies, and to the community.	
John Michael Large	For service to motor sports as an administrator, particularly through the Confederation of Australian Motor Sport and the Federation Internationale de lAutomobile.	
Sandra Mara Lashchuk	For service to the community, particularly as a counsellor and educator, and through the development of tertiary and community courses providing training in counselling and personal development.	
Delwyn Bernice Leggatt	For service to local government and to the community of Bacchus Marsh through health care and sporting organisations.	
Arthur Leslie Leggett	For service to veterans and their families through the Ex-Prisoner of War Association of Western Australia, and to the community.	
Jane Hamilton Lewis	For service to croquet, particularly as a coach.	
Henry Heinz Lippmann	For service to the community, particularly through the preservation and recording of the history of the immigrants of HMT Dunera.	
Ian Maxwell Lofts	For service to the brass band movement, particularly in the Wimmera region as a teacher, conductor and administrator.	
The Reverend Father Michael John Lowcock	For service to the community of north-west Queensland through the Catholic Church.	
Douglas Raymond Luckraft	For service to sport, particularly to table tennis as a player, umpire, official and administrator.	
Dr Meroula Fellowes Lukis	For service to the preservation and recording of Australias cultural heritage, particularly through the National Trust of Australia (Western Australia) and the Royal Western Australian Historical Society.	
John Francis Lupp	For service to veterans and their families through the Association of First Infantry Battalions.	
Kenneth Alexander Lyall	For service to education and to the community, particularly through the Baptist Union of Victoria.	
Murray Roland Lydeamore	For service to the community as chaplain and welfare coordinator to elite athletes in Australia.	
Raymond William Macourt	For service to the community of the Australian Capital Territory as a founder and conductor of amateur musical groups.	
Marita Ann Macrae	For service to the environment through a number of organisations, particularly the Pittwater Natural Heritage Association and the Avalon Preservation Trust.	
Professor John Sydney Mainstone	For service to education in the fields of physics and atmospheric research, and to the community.	
Mieczyslaw Malecki	For service to the Polish community in Australia.	
Ronald Philip Males	For service to the horse breeding industry, to equine sports, and to people with disabilities.	
Valerie Rose Males	For service to the horse breeding industry, to equine sports, and to people with disabilities.	
Christopher Paul Maley	For service to the community, particularly through Marist Youth Care and by providing pro bono legal services for a range of organisations.	
James George Maley	For service to the Western Australian fruit and vegetable industry, and to the community.	
William Bowden Mann	For service to the community of Chinchilla, particularly through the Rotary Club of Chinchilla.	
Gretta Adele Maston	For service to the community, particularly through a range of organisations serving veterans and their families.	
Marie Lynette Mathew	For service to women's hockey and to the community of Grafton.	
Ronald James May	For service to the community, particularly through Lions International.	
Thomas Sutton Mayne	For service to the Indigenous community, particularly in the area of reconciliation and through the Anglican Church, and to World Vision.	
Carl Russell McConnell	For service to the arts as a ceramic artist and teacher of the craft.	
John Gregory McDonald	For service to the media and to the community through television, particularly as the producer of commemorative telecasts.	
Olive Helen McDonald	For service to people with disabilities and their families through a range of organisations, particularly the Down Syndrome Association of Victoria.	
John Stewart McDougall	For service to athletics and to professional boxing as an administrator, official and coach.	
Keith Hadley McIlvride	For service to the beekeeping industry, particularly in the areas of research, administration and management.	
Barrie Allaster McLellan	For service to the sugar industry as a grower and in the areas of research and development, to the environment, particularly in relation to water management, and to the community.	
Geoffrey Bruce McLennan	For service to the community through a range of organisations, particularly Rotary International.	
Beverley Margaret McNamara	For service to the community, particularly through the Crime Victims Support Association Victoria.	
Noel John McNamara	For service to the community, particularly through the Crime Victims Support Association Victoria.	
Alan Charles McPherson	For service to the community of Cairns through a range of business, sporting, educational, cultural and service organisations.	
Frederick William McWilliam	For service to golf as a coach and by encouraging young people and women to enter the sport.	
Laura Mecca	For service to the Italian community, particularly through the Italian Historical Society.	
Henry Allan Meyer	For service to the Australian citrus industry, particularly through improvement in fruit quality and the development of overseas market opportunities.	
Peter John Michelson	For service to the people of Vietnam through a range of health and welfare programs.	
Neville Ivan Miles	For service to the dairy industry, particularly through diversification of milk products and introducing new marketing arrangements, and to the community.	
Trevor Gordon Milgate	For service to the community in the Lower Hunter region through the provision of emergency services.	
Alan Kaufman Milston	For service to the community, particularly through Rostrum Australia, and to the engineering profession.	
Christine June Min	For service through the provision of immediate medical assistance to victims of the bombings which occurred in Bali on 12 October 2002.	
Rex Wesley Mitchell	For service to the community of Glenthompson and to local government.	
Dr Margaret Catherine Moody	For service to medicine and to the community, particularly by providing medical services for people affected by drug and alcohol abuse and the victims of sexual assault.	
Irene Sarah Moore	For service to the community of Pittsworth.	
John Douglas Morrison	For service to the community of eastern Sydney, particularly through youth, church, amateur theatre and service groups.	
Andrea Mary Mulligan	For service to the community, particularly through the United Hospital Auxiliaries of New South Wales.	
Victor Jack Murray	For service to veterans through the Western Australian Division of the Royal Australian Air Force Association, and to the community.	
Dr Reuben John Myhill	For service to dentistry through contributions to professional associations and to the community.	
Brother Michael Naughtin	For service to secondary education, particularly through St Josephs College, as a teacher and administrator.	
Randall Nelson	For service to the community through the Kings Cross Bikers Social and Welfare Club.	
Vincent Ahearn Nelson	For service to the community of Wollongong, particularly people with disabilities and the ageing through recreational and social activities.	
David John Neville	For service to the community of Mt Isa, particularly through the Royal Flying Doctor Service Auxiliary and the Leichhardt Lions Club.	
Evan Harry Newton	For service to youth through the Scouting movement, and to the community.	
Jennifer Roslyn North	For service to the community of East Gippsland, particularly through the establishment of the Gondwanaland Project, and to environmental conservation.	
Margaret Mary O'Bryan	For service to the community and to art education, particularly through the National Gallery of Victoria Voluntary Guides.	
Francis Edward O'Donnell	For service to the community through fundraising for a range of charitable organisations and promoting ethics and accountability in fundraising.	
Bernard John O'Shea	For service to the community, particularly the welfare of veterans and their families through the Returned and Services League of Australia.	
Peter George O'Sullivan	For service to the community, particularly through social welfare organisations including Lifelink Samaritans.	
Clemens Oscar Obst	For service to primary production in South Australia, particularly through the development and promotion of clay spreading techniques to increase water efficiency and retention in sandy soils.	
Dr Colin Blackwood Officer	For service to the community of Seymour, particularly as an environmentalist and as a medical practitioner.	
Dr Jean Elizabeth Olley	For service to conservation and the environment, particularly through the promotion of ecotourism and the establishment of Tilligerry Habitat.	
Sister Margaret Mary Olsen	For service to the community, particularly people living with HIV/AIDS and their families through the Adelaide Diocesan AIDS Council.	
Francis Darenberg Osborn	For service to the Australian wine industry and to the McLaren Vale region.	
Norman Robert Osborne	For service to track and field athletics, particularly through coaching and coach education programs.	
Frances Overmars	For service to conservation and to environmental management and protection in the Werribee-Keilor Plains region.	
Catherine Gloria Parkes	For service to water polo as a player, coach and administrator and through the establishment and promotion of school competitions.	
Margaret Jean Pawsey	For service to the community as a foster parent to babies and children with disabilities.	
Maurice Raymond Pawsey	For service to the communities of Taggerty and Alexandra.	
Kenneth Peake-Jones	For service to the community as a historian, particularly through the Royal Geographical Society of South Australia.	
Peter Stanley Pearse	For service to the welfare of veterans and their families, particularly through the Tubercular Ex-Service Association of Victoria.	
Roger Frederick Pegram	For service to swimming, particularly as an administrator and historian, and to the Olympic Council and Australian Commonwealth Games Association in New South Wales.	
Van Dang Phan	For service to the community through the establishment of the Vietnamese Parents with Disabled Children Support Group in New South Wales.	
Raymond Leonard Pitman	For service to the children of Australian Defence Force families through programs to assist with integration into new school environments.	
Mary Frances Pownall	For service to the community of Narrabri through a range of service, social and women's organisations.	
David Antony Prince	For service to sports administration and to athletics.	
Marcus James Quinlivan	For service to the welfare of veterans through the Returned and Services League of Australia.	
Dr Eric Vaughan Ratcliff	For service to psychiatry and to the community through the preservation of heritage buildings in Tasmania.	
Patricia Fitzgerald Ratcliff	For service to the preservation of heritage buildings and to the recording of historical events in Tasmania.	
Dr Janardhen Chevella Reddy	For service to medicine as a general practitioner in the Culcairn Shire.	
Kevin James Roberts	For service to the community in the Shoalhaven area.	
Bruce Neville Robson	For service to education, particularly through the Temple Christian College.	
Dr Olbert William Rogers	For service to dentistry, particularly through the development of implant procedures, and to the community through the Rotary Club of Sutherland.	
Joyce Lilian Rowe	For service to the community, particularly by promoting parental involvement in education through school parents clubs.	
John Ryan	For service to the welfare of veterans and their families through the Australian Federation of Totally and Permanently Incapacitated Ex-Servicemen and Women.	
Phillip Harry Samuell	For service to the Jewish community of Western Australia.	
Emeritus Professor Ronald John Sandeman	For service to science education, particularly through the National Youth Science Forum.	
Anthony Neil Sansom	For service to the community of the Central Coast region through local government, business and tourism development, and social welfare organisations.	
Glenn Kevin Sargeant	For service to education and to youth, particularly through the establishment of the Young Mothers Program at Plumpton High School.	
Paul Stephen Sattler	For service to biodiversity conservation, particularly in Queensland.	
John Stephen Saywell	For service to veterans and their families through the Royal Australian Navy Radio Mechanics Association.	
Dr Jacqueline Meredith Scurlock	For service to paediatric medicine, particularly in the area of Sudden Infant Death Syndrome and through the Ngala Family Resource Centre.	
Joseph Andrew Shanahan	For service to the community in the Tamworth district.	
Diana Vicki Sher	For service to the community, particularly through the Windana Society Incorporated.	
Dorothy Patricia Shipard	For service to athletes with disabilities, particularly through the Goldfields Disabled Sports Association.	
Kevin Wayne Simmons	For service to the ex-Service communities of Gwabegar and Baradine.	
Dr Peter George Simpson	For service to science education, particularly through the Chemistry Olympiad Program in Western Australia, and to the community.	
Trevor John Simpson	For service to the community of Wentworthville, particularly through the Wentworthville Leagues Junior Ju-Jitsu Club.	
Allan George Skinner	For service to the community of Wingham.	
Douglas Adam Sloan	For service to visually impaired people, particularly through the Victorian Blind Cricket and Golf Associations.	
Arthur James Smith	For service to the community in the field of health administration and through a range of welfare, church and service organisations.	
Audrey Smith	For service to the communities of Glenorchy and Montrose.	
Dr Kevin Robert Smith	For service to the community, particularly through Lions Clubs International and the Returned and Services League of Australia.	
The Reverend Canon Martin Barry Smith	For service to the community through the Anglican Church, particularly in the Diocese of Melbourne, and to aged care.	
Peter Philip Smith	For service to the community, particularly through voluntary promotional assistance to charitable organisations.	
Peter Richard Smith	For service to veterans and their families through the Korea and South East Asia Forces Association of Australia and the Returned and Services League of Australia, and to the community of Mannum.	
Sadie Snewin	For service to the welfare of veterans and their families through Torchbearers for Legacy in South Australia.	
Robert Torquil Sobey	For service to youth through the Scouting movement and the Canberra Police and Citizens Youth Club.	
Ian Edward Sodeman	For service to children with disabilities, particularly through the development and provision of recreational opportunities.	
William Henry Sommers	For service to local government and to the community of Altona.	
Edward Richard Southcombe	For service to conservation and the environment, particularly in the Geelong area, and as a contributor to the establishment of the Australian Naturalists Network.	
Dr Graeme John Southwick	For service through the provision of immediate medical assistance to victims of the bombings which occurred in Bali on 12 October 2002.	
Dr Ian Grant Spencer	For service to medicine as a general practitioner in the Wellington area.	
The Reverend Christopher Stafferton	For service to members of the Australian Defence Force through the Military Christian Fellowship of Australia.	
Brian Leonard Stahl	For service to local government and to the communities of Hastings and Western Port through social welfare, business, sporting and educational organisations.	
Ronald Arthur Stevens	For service to music as a performer, examiner, administrator and teacher.	
Colin Joseph Sullivan	For service to local government in New South Wales and to the community of Casino.	
Yehuda Svoray	For service to the community, particularly through the University of the Third Age and B'nai B'rith.	
Keith Malcolm Swan	For service to animal welfare as a teacher of farriery skills to veterinarians and horse owners.	
Ramknas Kazimieras Tarvydas	For service to the Lithuanian community in Tasmania.	
Janice Evelin Tate	For service to the community in the Southern Highlands, particularly through the Life Education program and the Guiding movement.	
James Taylor	For service to the coal industry, particularly through the union movement, and to the community through service and sporting organisations.	
Ruth Margaret Teasdale	For service to the community in the Boree Creek district, particularly through the Country Women's Association of New South Wales and the Anglican Church.	
Harvey Teller	For service to the Jewish community of Melbourne through the Yeshivah Welfare Relief Fund.	
William Henry Temple	For service to the welfare of veterans through the South Eastern District Branch of the Returned and Services League of Australia.	
Dr Peter Dean Thomas	For service through the provision of medical assistance to the victims of the bombings which occurred in Bali on 12 October 2002.	
Annette Lillie Thomson	For service to the agricultural show movement, to the dairy industry, particularly through the Holstein-Friesian Association of Australia, and to the community.	
Elizabeth Gillies Thomson	For service to the agricultural show movement, to the dairy industry, particularly through the Holstein-Friesian Association of Australia, and to the community.	
Roy Thomas Thredgold	For service to veterans and their families, particularly through the Keswick and Richmond Sub-Branch of the Returned and Services League of Australia, and to the community through the Richmond Lions Club.	
William Gerrard Tickell	For service to education as a teacher, academic and administrator, to the union movement, and to the community, particularly through basketball administration.	
Christopher John Timpson	For service to sport and to children with disabilities, particularly through the ACT Junior Talent Squad for Athletes with Disabilities.	
Graham Lincoln Trethewey	For service to the community of Kangaroo Island through local government, conservation and historical preservation activities and economic development projects.	
Dr Eugenie Mary Tuck	For service to the welfare of prisoners through the development of improved practices in the management of State correctional health systems.	
Superintendent Michael van Heythuysen	For service to ethnic communities in the Northern Territory, particularly evacuees from East Timor.	
Eric Francis Van Leeuwen	For service to the community, particularly through the activities and programs of Probus and Rotary Clubs in Wangaratta.	
Kathrine Suzanne Vern-Barnett	For service to the dental profession, particularly through the NSW Dental Assistants Association.	
Eric Wilfred Vickerman	For service to the environment, particularly in the areas of bush conservation and regeneration and wildlife protection.	
Antonin Vincenc	For service to the Czech and Slovak communities in the Canberra district, particularly through the Czechoslovak-Australian Association of Canberra and Region Inc, BESEDA.	
Margot Anne Vowles	For service to local government and to the community of Walkerville.	
Patrick Darcy Walden	For service to gymnastics in South Australia and to the community through the Tea Tree Gully Youth Club.	
Douglas William Wallace	For service to natural science through the study of arachnids, particularly in the Central Queensland region.	
Julianna Walton	For service to local government through the City of Sydney Council, and to the community.	
Stanley John Watson	For service to aviculture through the Budgerigar Society of South Australia.	
Donald Joseph Webb	For service to the community in the Grampians region and to local government.	
Melva Ann Welch	For service to the community through researching and recording local history in the Pine Rivers Shire and Arana Hills district.	
John P. H. Wheaton	For service to the communities of Gilgandra and Gulargambone.	
James Francis Whipper	For service to the communities of Newcastle and the Hunter Valley region as an entertainer and fundraiser for a range of service, youth, aged care and ex-Service organisations.	
Beryl Mary Whiteley	For service as a benefactor to the visual arts through the creation and endowment of the Brett Whiteley Travelling Art Scholarship.	
Doreen Grace Wilkinson	For service to the community, particularly through the Camden Show Society.	
Heather Jean Wilkinson	For service as a palliative care nurse in the Hamilton district.	
Raymond John Wilson	For service to the community of Gladesville.	
Colleen Ann Woolley	For service to the community, particularly through the Retired Police Association and through researching and documenting the history of women in policing in Victoria.	
John Shirley Wright	For service to the community, particularly through the Australian Retirement Foundation and the Waverley Community and Seniors Association, and to the hardware industry.	
Lorna Ruth Wright	For service to international relations through social welfare activities in Sri Lanka, particularly through the Memory of Mother Foundation and the LaSallian Community Education Service.	
Jean Russel Yule	For service to the community through the Uniting Church in Australia.	

==== Military Division ====
Branch	Recipient	Citation	Notes
Navy	Lieutenant Commander Phillip Charles Anderson	For meritorious service to the Royal Australian Navy and the Navy Band in the field of music.	
Navy	Warrant Officer Robert Andrew Bohm	For outstanding service as the Fleet Warrant Officer Cook in the National Sea Training Group providing workup training to ships and other units of Maritime Command.	
Navy	Warrant Officer Mark Dixon	For meritorious service to the Royal Australian Navy in the field of submarine engineering.	
Navy	Warrant Officer Ross Allan McRae	For meritorious service to the Royal Australian Navy, particularly as a Combat System Manager in numerous key sea and shore postings since 1992.	
Army	Warrant Officer Class One Geoffrey William Abbott	For meritorious performance as the Career Manager, Royal Australian Electrical and Mechanical Engineers, at the Soldier Career Management Agency.	
Army	Warrant Officer Class One Timothy John Chislett	For meritorious service in the fields of soldier and organisational management as Squadron Sergeant Major of the 17th Construction Squadron, as Regimental Sergeant Major for the Corps of the Royal Australian Engineers and as Regimental Sergeant Major of 3rd Combat Engineer Regiment.	
Army	Sergeant Sandra Ann McInerney	For meritorious service as a Very Important Persons driver over a period of 18 years.	
Army	Warrant Officer Class One Kieran Peter O'Brien	For meritorious performance as the Regimental Sergeant Major of the Monash University Regiment and the 6th Battalion, The Royal Australian Regiment.	
Air Force	Wing Commander Anthony Dibdin Checker	For meritorious performance of duty as the Senior Armament Test Engineer with the Aircraft Stores Compatibility Engineering Agency and the Fighter Weapons Systems Liaison Officer at the Aircraft Research and Development Unit.	
Air Force	Warrant Officer Michael Godfrey Doring	For outstanding service in the performance of duty as Squadron Warrant Officer at Defence National Storage and Distribution Centre Williamtown.	
Air Force	Wing Commander Anthony Marc Forestier	For meritorious service developing Australian Defence Force doctrine and as Commanding Officer of the School of Air Navigation.	
Air Force	Flight Lieutenant Christopher William Murdock	For outstanding service in the development and management of Air Force Personnel Management Information Systems.	
