= James Dale (scientist) =

Australian agricultural scientist

James Dale AC
- Born: James Langham Dale
- Education: University of Sydney
- Awards: Companion of the Order of Australia (2022); Queensland Greats Award (2015)
- Scientific career
- Workplaces: Queensland University of Technology

James Langham Dale AC is an Australian agricultural scientist. He is a professor in the Faculty of Science School of Biology & Environmental Science at Queensland University of Technology (QUT).

Dale is best known for development of improved strains of bananas. In 2021, his team earned recognition for a strain of Cavendish bananas resistant to Panama disease tropical race 4.

== Early life ==
Dale grew up in a harbour-side suburb of Sydney. He was more interested in sport than science until late in high school. He then went to University of Sydney and on completion of his undergraduate degree, immediately continued into his PhD, supervised by plant virologist Adrian Gibbs, and completed in 1975.

== Research ==
In 2004, he led a team at QUT to apply for a grant from the Gates Foundation in conjunction with the National Agricultural Research Organisation of Uganda. The goal is to develop bananas, a staple crop in Uganda, to address nutrition deficiencies of Vitamin A and iron in Ugandan diets. The technology is developed in Australia, but transferred to Uganda to develop local expertise.

== Awards and honours ==
- Dale was made an Officer of the Order of Australia in the 2004 Queen's Birthday Honours for service as a leader in the field of agricultural biotechnology research and development, particularly plant virus resistance. This was increased to Companion of the Order of Australia in the 2022 Australia Day Honours for eminent service to agricultural science, particularly through biological and biotechnological research and development, leadership, and to gene technology.
- He received a Queensland Greats Award in 2015.
- Queensland state recipient of Senior Australian of the Year in 2019
