= John Percival Jennings =

Australian horticulturalist (1923–2003)

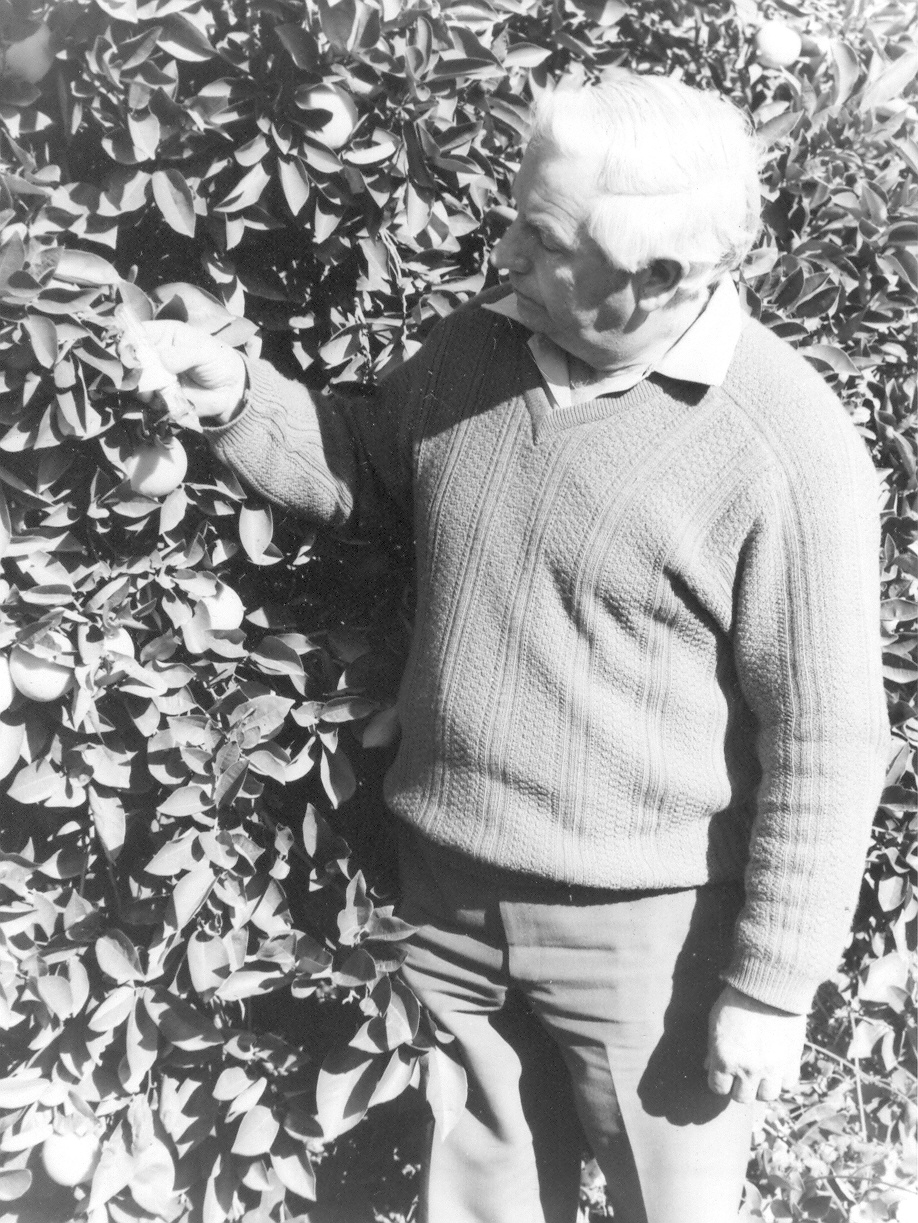
- Born: 9 May 1923; Renmark, South Australia
- Died: 16 December 2003 (aged 80); Waikerie, South Australia
- Education: Roseworthy Agricultural College
- Occupation: Horticulturist
- Years active: 1945–1982
- Spouse(s): Erica Lucy Price (m. 1948), Judith (Judy) Good (née Hudson) (m. 1992)
- Children: 2

John Percival Jennings (9 May 1923 – 16 December 2003) was an Australian horticulturalist who was a senior adviser for the South Australian Department of Agriculture.

== Early life, education and career ==
Jennings was born on 9 May 1923, in Renmark, South Australia, the youngest child of Mary Milne Paterson and John Patrick Jennings. He attended Renmark West Primary School for six years (1928–1933) and then completed grade 7 at Renmark Town Primary School before going to Renmark High School, where he won a scholarship to attend Roseworthy Agricultural College. He graduated with a Diploma in Agriculture in 1944.

Shortly after graduating, Jennings was appointed the first Assistant Manager of the Berri Experimental Orchard on 14 February 1945. In 1948 he was appointed the first Officer in Charge of the Viticultural Research Station at Nuriootpa.

In early 1957, just as the great 1956 Murray River flood was receding, the family moved to Waikerie when Jennings was appointed Horticultural Adviser. His district covered Nildottie, Swan Reach, Blanchetown, Morgan, Cadell, Ramco, Waikerie, Kingston On Murray and lots of smaller areas in-between. John retired in 1982 as Senior Horticultural Adviser.

== Other interests ==
Jennings had a wide range of interests and memberships:

He was Chairman, President, or Secretary of numerous organizations, including the Waikerie Agricultural Bureau (Life Member), Waikerie Hospital Board, St John Ambulance, Probus, Meals on Wheels, Waikerie Amateur Swimming Club (Life Member), Waikerie Progress Association, Waikerie Arts Centre Committee, and the Caravan Park Committee. The story goes that he was on the committee of some 25 organisations within a year of coming to Waikerie from Nuriootpa.

At various times, Jennings was also Secretary of the SA Avocado Growers Association and the SA Citrus Improvement Committee and was a member of the River Murray Water Resources Advisory Committee, Golden Heights Irrigation Area Board of Management, Loxton/Waikerie Animal Plant Control Board, and the Riverland Community Health Services Inc. John also served as Councillor on the District Council of Waikerie for 12 years representing both Ramco and Town Wards. As recognition for his tireless work, Jennings Park in Waikerie and Jennings Road in Golden Heights are both named after him.

Jennings had citrus orchards in both Golden Heights and Ramco Heights.

== Recognition ==
• 1978: Serving Brother, Order of St. John

• 1980: Riverland Citizen of the Year

• 1982: Imperial Service Medal

• 2004: Medal of the Order of Australia (posthumous), Queen's Birthday Honours (Australia)

John P Jennings Park in Waikerie named after him.

== Personal life ==
Jennings married Erica Lucy Price in the Sandy Creek Congregational Church 21 August 1948. Erica died 25 August 1991 Waikerie, South Australia. John married Judith (Judy) Good (née Hudson) 27 July 1996 Waikerie, South Australia. Judy died 17 October 2002 Waikerie, South Australia.

John and Erica had two children: the entomologist John T. Jennings and his sister Meredith.
