= Diocese of Townsville =

Latin Catholic diocese in Australia

Diocese of Townsville Dioecesis Tovnsvillensis
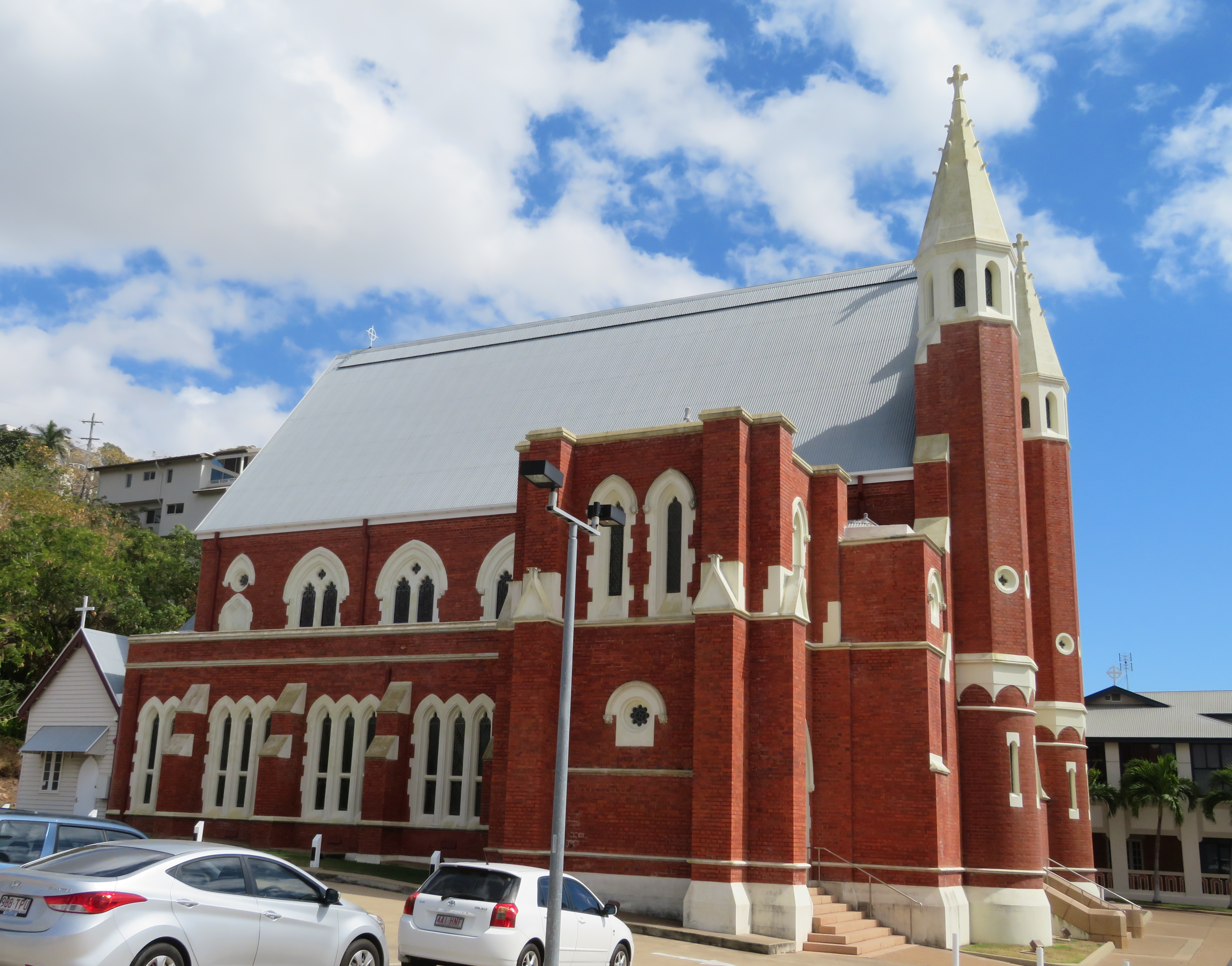
- Sacred Heart Cathedral in Townsville

Location
- Country: Australia
- Territory: North Queensland
- Ecclesiastical province: Brisbane
- Coordinates: 19°15′32″S 146°48′42″E

Statistics
- Area: 435,200 km^{2} (168,000 sq mi)
- Population: Total; Catholics: (as of 2004); ▲252,289; ▲74,084 (▲29.4%%)
- Parishes: ▼27

Information
- Denomination: Catholic Church
- Sui iuris church: Latin Church
- Rite: Roman Rite
- Established: 12 February 1930
- Cathedral: Sacred Heart Cathedral, Townsville

Current leadership
- Pope: Leo XIV
- Bishop: Tim Harris

Map

Website
- Catholic Diocese of Townsville

The Diocese of Townsville is a Latin Church ecclesiastical jurisdiction or diocese of the Catholic Church in Australia. It is a suffragan in the ecclesiastical province of the metropolitan Archdiocese of Brisbane. Erected in 1930, the Diocese of Townsville covers North Queensland. It was assembled from territory separated from the Diocese of Rockhampton.

== Bishops ==
The following men have been Bishops of Townsville:

Order	Name	Date enthroned	Reign ended	Term of office	Reason for term end
1	Terence Bernard McGuire †	12 February 1930	14 June 1938	8 years, 122 days	Appointed Bishop of Goulburn
2	Hugh Edward Ryan †	13 July 1938	14 September 1967	29 years, 63 days	Retired and appointed Bishop Emeritus of Townsville
3	Leonard Anthony Faulkner †	14 September 1967	2 September 1983	15 years, 353 days	Elevated as Coadjutor Archbishop of Adelaide
4	Raymond Conway Benjamin †	14 February 1984	18 April 2000	16 years, 64 days	Retired and appointed Bishop Emeritus of Townsville
5	Michael Ernest Putney †	24 January 2001	28 March 2014	13 years, 53 days	Died in office
6	Timothy James Harris	3 May 2017	incumbent		

=== Other priest of this diocese who became bishop ===
- Francis Roberts Rush †, appointed Bishop of Rockhampton in 1960

== Parishes ==
The diocese is divided into four separate deaneries that administer individual parishes:

1. Townsville deanery with regular liturgical services held in Sacred Heart Cathedral, North Ward (St Joseph's), Cranbrook (Holy Spirit), Deeragun (St Anthony), Gulliver (Holy Family), Kirwan (The Good Shepherd), Magnetic Island (St Joan of Arc), Mundingburra (Blessed Mary MacKillop), Railway Estate (St Francis), South Townsville (St Patrick), West Townsville (St Mary), and Wulguru (St Joseph the Worker)
2. Northern deanery with regular liturgical services held in Abergowrie (St Theresa), Halifax (St Peter), Ingham (St Patrick), and Palm Island (St Anne)
3. Southern deanery with regular liturgical services held in Ayr (Sacred Heart), Bowen (St Mary), Burdekin Valley (St Joseph), Cannonvale (St Martin), Collinsville (Our Lady of Lourdes), Giru (St Joseph), Home Hill (St Colman), and Proserpine (St Catherine)
4. Western deanery with regular liturgical services held in Charters Towers (St Columba), Cloncurry (St Colman), Hughenden (Sacred Heart), Julia Creek (Holy Rosary), McKinlay (Our Lady of the Way), Mount Isa (Good Shepherd), Richmond (St Brigid), and Winton (St Patrick)

== Schools ==
The Townsville Catholic Education Office operates a number of schools in the diocese:

Townsville Schools

Annandale
- Southern Cross Catholic College (primary & secondary)
Burdell
- St Clare's Catholic School (primary)
Cranbrook
- Holy Spirit Catholic School (primary)
Currajong
- Marian Catholic School (primary)
Deeragun
- St Anthony's Catholic College (primary & secondary)
Hyde Park
- St Margaret Mary's College (secondary)
Kirwan
- Ryan Catholic College (primary & secondary)
Mundingburra
- St Joseph's Catholic School (primary)
North Ward
- St Joseph's Catholic School (primary)
Rasmussen
- Good Shepherd Catholic School (primary)
Shaw
- St Benedict's Catholic School (primary)
- Mary Help of Christians Catholic College (secondary)
Palm Island
- St Michael's Catholic School (primary)

Southern Schools

Ayr
- St Francis Catholic School (primary)
- Burdekin Catholic High School (secondary)
Bowen
- St Mary's Catholic School (primary)
Collinsville
- St John Bosco Catholic School (primary)
Home Hill
- St Colman's Catholic School (primary)
Proserpine
- St Catherine's Catholic College (primary & Secondary)

Northern Schools

Abergowrie
- St Teresa's College (secondary)
Halifax
- St Peter's Catholic School, Halifax (primary)
Ingham
- Our Lady of Lourdes Catholic School, Ingham (primary)
- Gilroy Santa Maria College, Ingham (secondary)

Western Schools

Charters Towers
- Columba Catholic College (primary & secondary)
Cloncurry
- St Joseph's Catholic School, (primary - Year 9)
Hughenden
- St Francis Catholic School, (primary)
Mount Isa
- St Joseph's Catholic School (primary)
- St Kieran's Catholic School (primary)
- Good Shepherd Catholic College (secondary)
Winton
- St Patrick's Catholic School, (primary)

== Gallery ==
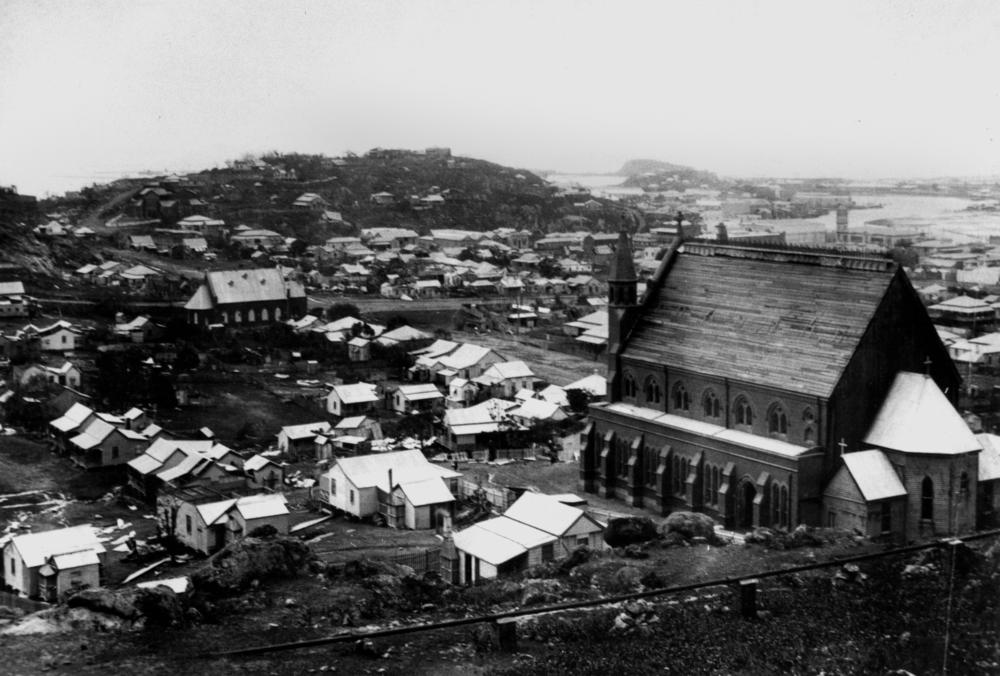
Sacred Heart Cathedral, Townsville,
taken in 1903 after Cyclone Leonta

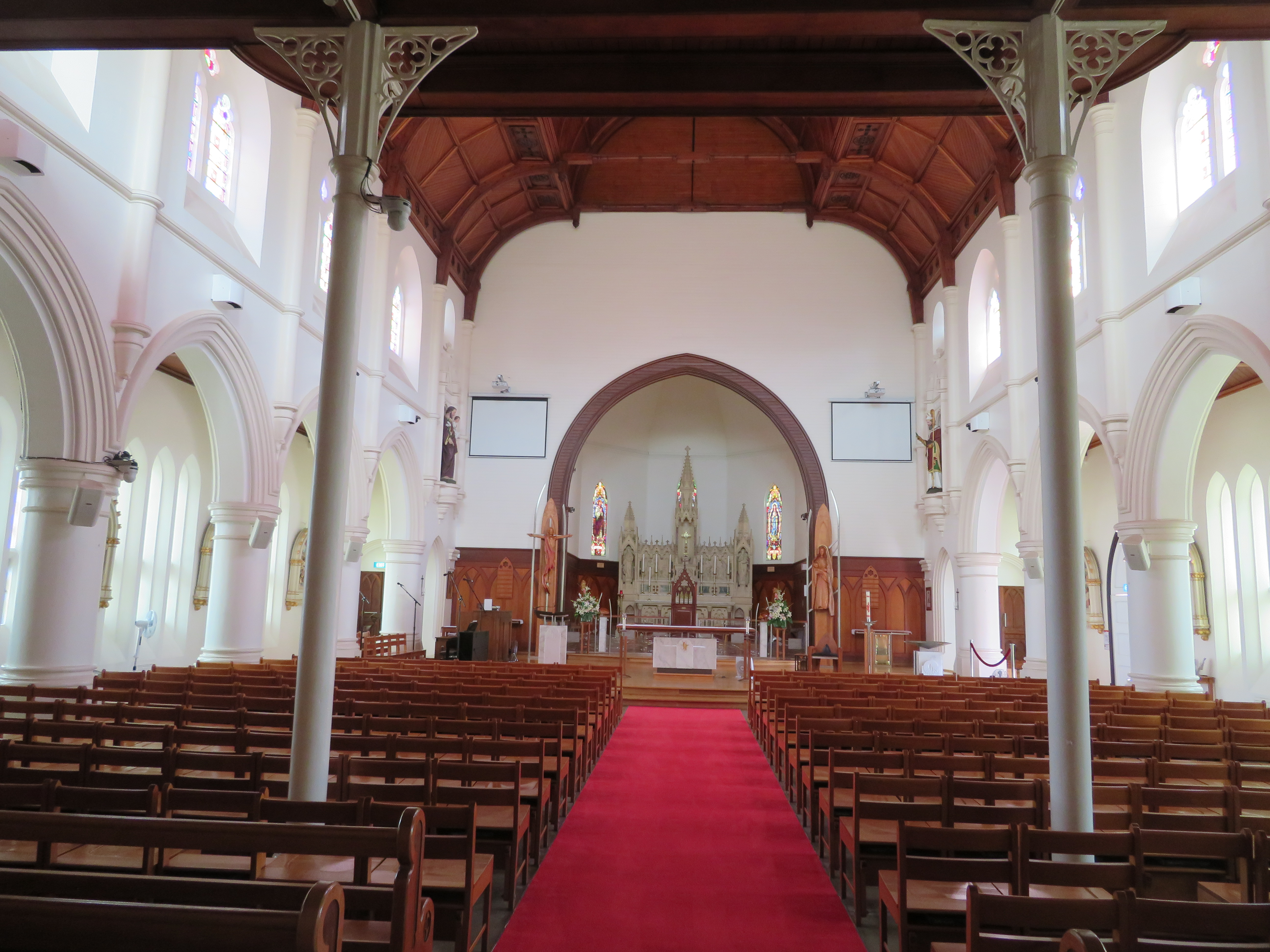
Interior of Sacred Heart Cathedral

== See also ==
- Catholic Church in Australia
