= Sacred Heart Cathedral, Townsville =

- Church of the Sacred Heart
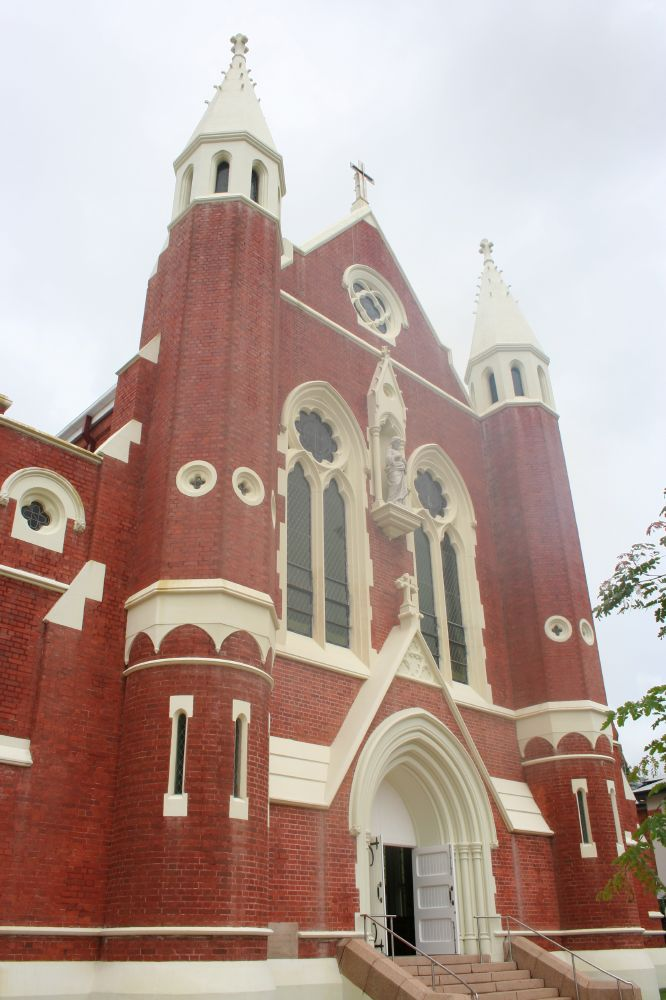
- Sacred Heart Cathedral, 2007
- Sacred Heart Cathedral, Townsville
- 19°15′32″S 146°48′42″E
- Address: 266 Stanley Street, Townsville CBD, City of Townsville, Queensland
- Country: Australia
- Denomination: Roman Catholic

History
- Status: Cathedral (since 1921); Parish church (1902–1921)
- Founded: 7 October 1900
- Founder(s): Right Rev. Dr Joseph Higgins, Bishop of Rockhampton
- Dedication: Sacred Heart of Jesus
- Dedicated: 16 November 1902 by Bishop Joseph Higgins

Architecture
- Architect(s): Reed, Smart & Tappin
- Architectural type: Church
- Style: Gothic Revival
- Years built: 1896–1902

Specifications
- Materials: Brick; corrugated iron

Administration
- Diocese: Townsville

Clergy
- Bishop: Tim Harris

Queensland Heritage Register
- Official name: Sacred Heart Cathedral, Church of the Sacred Heart
- Type: State heritage (built)
- Designated: 21 October 1992
- Reference no.: 600939
- Significant period: 1890s–1900s (historical) ongoing (social); 1902 (fabric)
- Significant components: Tower, cathedral, views to
- Builders: Dennis Kelleher

Sacred Heart Cathedral is a heritage-listed Roman Catholic cathedral at 266 Stanley Street, Townsville CBD, City of Townsville, Queensland, Australia. It was built from 1896 to 1902 by Dennis Kelleher. It is also known as Church of the Sacred Heart. It was added to the Queensland Heritage Register on 21 October 1992.

The cathedral is the seat of the Bishop of Townsville, currently Tim Harris.

== History ==
The Church of the Sacred Heart at Townsville was erected in at least two stages between 1896 and 1902, to plans prepared by Melbourne architects Reed, Smart & Tappin in 1894. Queensland architects Eaton, Bates and Polin of Brisbane, Townsville and Rockhampton supervised the work, and the contractor for the superstructure was Denis Kelleher.

The first Roman Catholic church in Townsville, St Joseph's, was erected on the Strand in the 1870s. Townsville itself had been established in the mid-1860s as a port to service the pastoral lands of the interior. Following the discovery of gold at Ravenswood and Charters Towers in the 1870s, the town boomed, and by the 1890s was the principal port of North Queensland. As the population of the town expanded and settlement moved west along Ross Creek, a more prominent, substantial and centrally-located Catholic church became a priority for the parish. In January 1884 Father William Mason Walsh, Townsville's second parish priest, acquired title to a half acre block in Stanley Street on the slopes of Castle Hill, above the main business district of Townsville, in anticipation of erecting a fine new church. However at this period the parish of Townsville was part of the Roman Catholic Diocese of Rockhampton, and was neither large nor wealthy, so it did not commence a building programme for the church on Stanley Street until the 1890s.

An 1894 design competition for the new church was won by prominent Melbourne architects Reed, Smart & Tappin. Their design was for a substantial brick building of Gothic style, comprising a large basement space, a superstructure consisting of naive, aisles, transept, sacristy, chapters and sanctuary, and an imposing front tower and spire rising 162 feet (49 m). There is some suggestion that the design for the Townsville church was a smaller version of the Sacred Heart Cathedral at Bendigo, Victoria, designed by the same architectural firm.

Excavation of the Stanley Street site, foundations and basement were carried out in 1896, at a cost of £1,160 for the basements alone. No further progress was made until 7 October 1900, when the Right Rev. Dr Joseph Higgins, Bishop of Rockhampton, laid the foundation stone. However, not until early 1902 did work commence on the first stage of the superstructure – nave and aisles. Denis Kelleher, who had erected the Catholic cathedral in Rockhampton, won the contract, which was completed within 10 months at a cost of £8,330, and the building blessed and opened by Bishop Higgins on 16 November 1902. The interior was considered to be remarkably well finished, with very fine ceilings of varnished pine, cut into panels and with fretwork borders.

Little more than three months after the November opening, the Church of the Sacred Heart was severely damaged by Cyclone Leonta, which struck Townsville on 3 March 1903. The building was unroofed (over 2 tons of iron sheeting) and substantial water damage to the interior resulted. The damage was repaired, but the original plan to build a belltower and extend the transept back towards Castle Hill in order to create a chapel behind the altar, was never carried out. Later a steel bell tower was erected.

Following the creation of the Roman Catholic Diocese of Townsville c. 1931, the Church of the Sacred Heart, as the church of the Bishop of Townsville, acquired cathedral status.

The roof was damaged again in 1972 during cyclone Althea, causing water damage to the interior northern wall. The steel belltower was removed and donated to the non-denominational chapel at Lavarack Barracks in the 1970s. Part of the side fence of decorative iron and brick posts was removed at the same time.

== Description ==
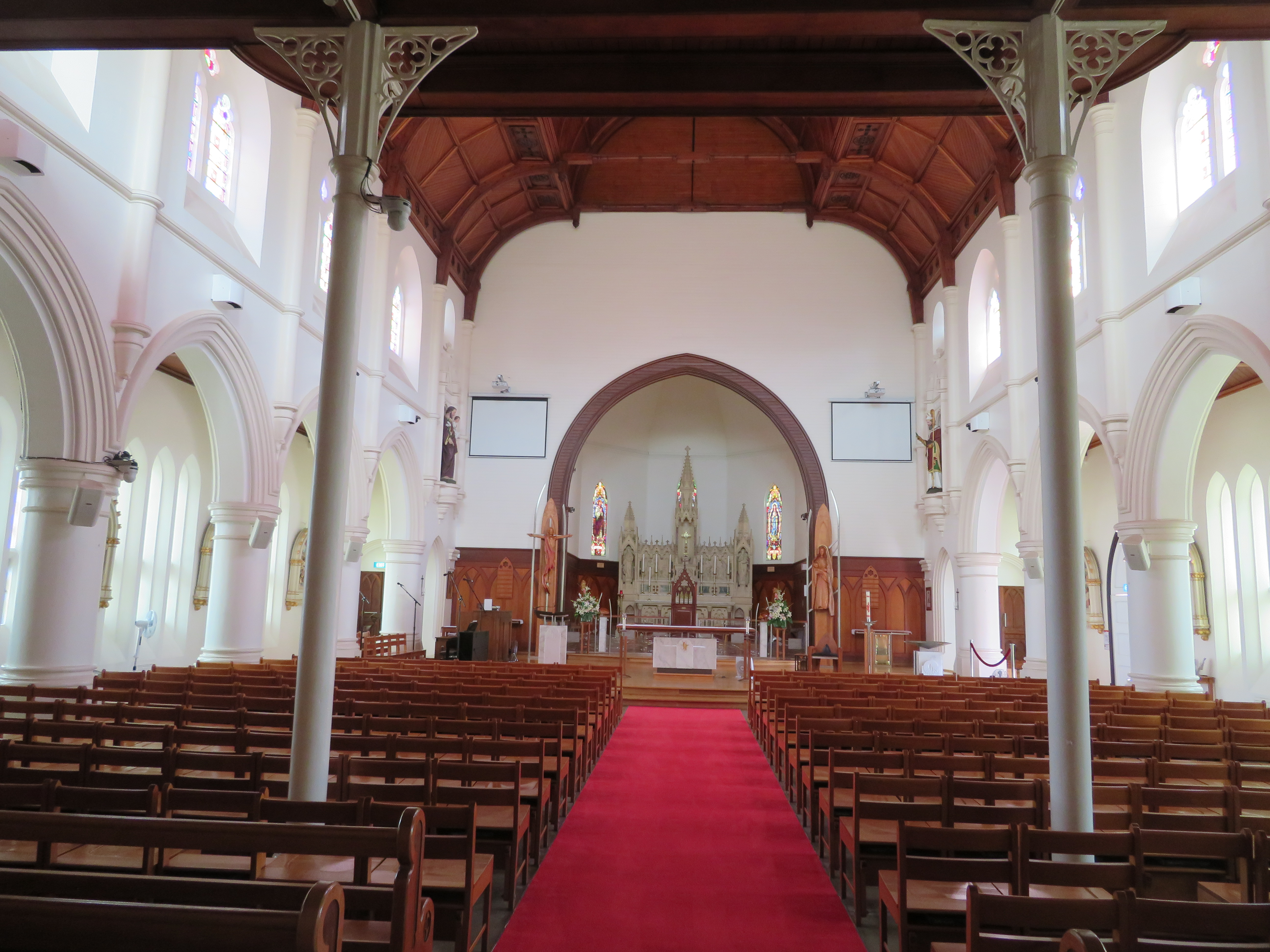
Sacred Heart Cathedral 2019

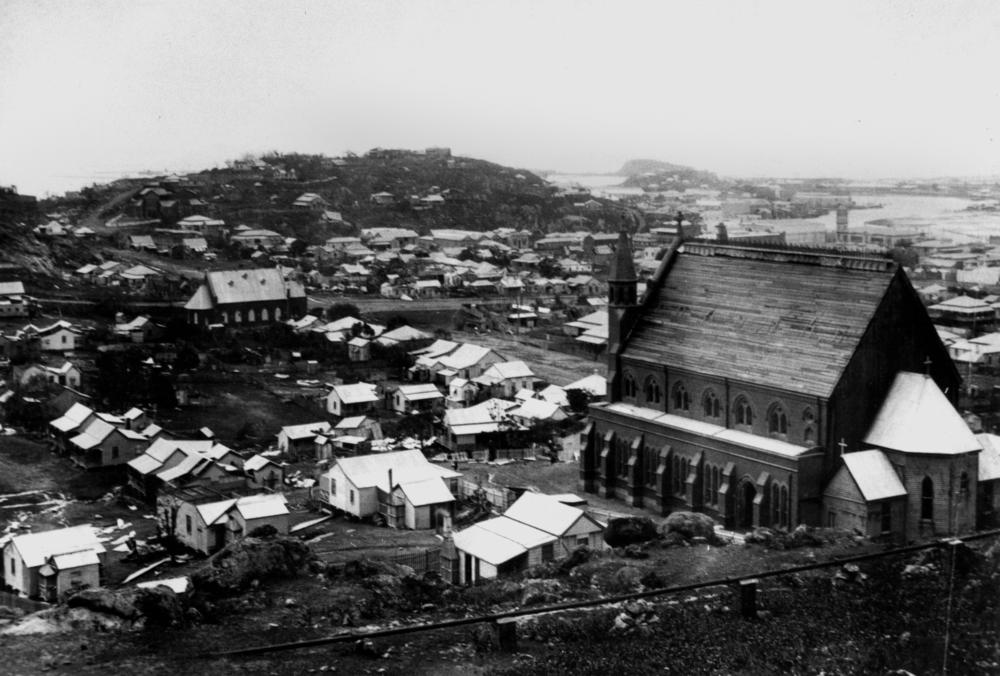
Sacred Heart Cathedral, 1903

The Sacred Heart Cathedral is rectangular in plan and is modelled on a Roman basilica design, with a high ceiling above the nave, aisles on either side and an apse which is framed by a timber arch lined with tongue and groove timber. The tunnel-vault with truss design ceiling is of tongue and groove board. The gable roof is of corrugated iron, and the facade has two turrets and large Gothic windows on either side of the central statue niche. The external walls of red face brick have tuck pointed mortar joints and contrasting cement rendered mouldings. An unusual feature of the structure is that it faces north-south rather than the traditional east-west direction of most cathedrals. The restricted hillside site was probably the reason for the placement of the building. The site is accessed from the northeast street frontage, and the altar faces southwest.

The cathedral is built on a rocky spur of Castle Hill, across from the equally commanding St James Anglican Cathedral, overlooking the central business district of the city. The lower slopes of the hill are covered with grass and small shrubs which cling to the rough terrain. A rock-faced retaining wall edges the cathedral block and creates a roadway from Stanley Street. Grassed areas surround the building together with small shrubs at the base of the main stairs. Close to the cathedral is a 1938, two-storey brick presbytery that houses the bishop of the Sacred Heart Cathedral and the priest of the cathedral parish. This building of red brick and stucco echoes some of the decorative features of the cathedral.

== Heritage listing ==
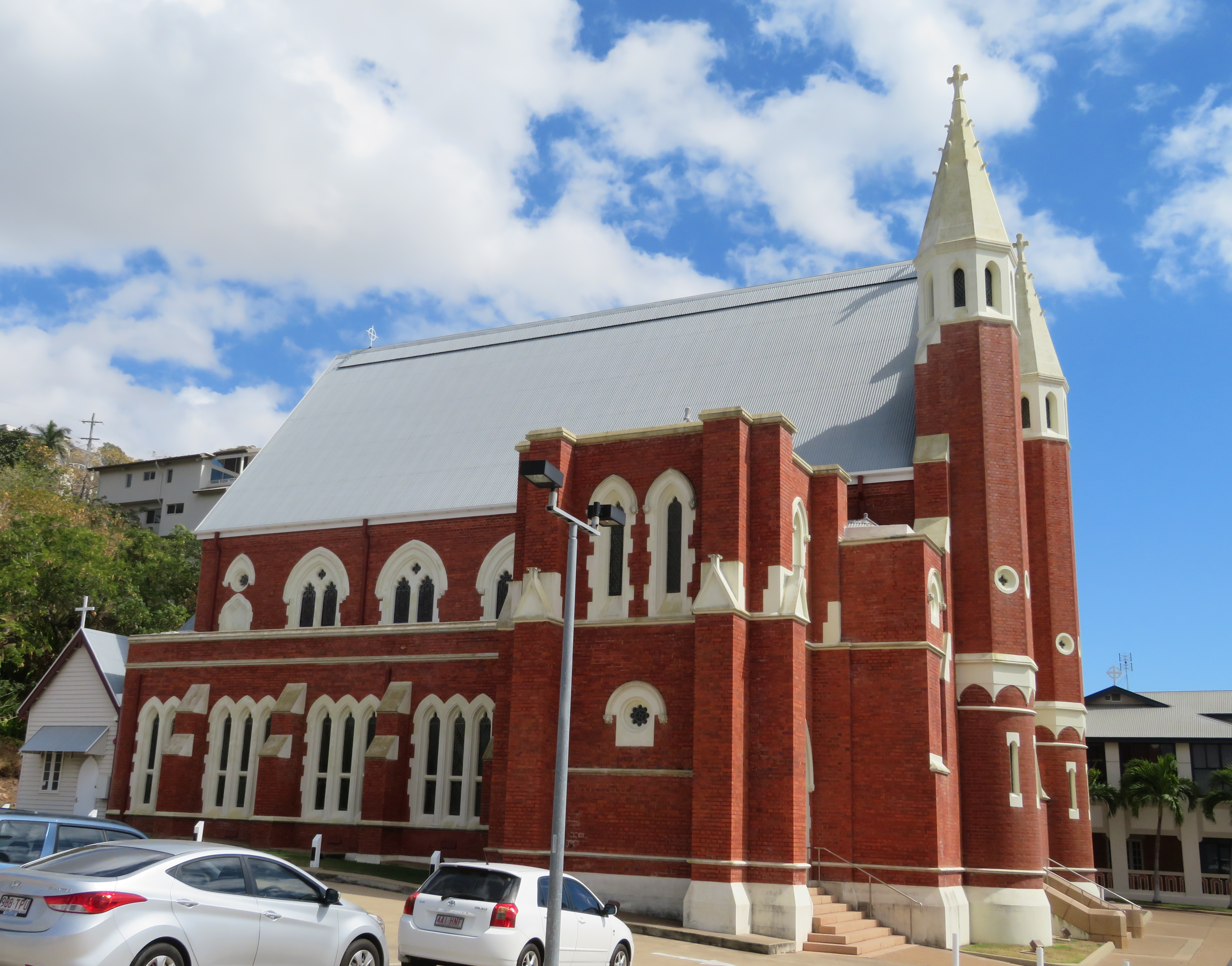
Sacred Heart Cathedral 2019

Sacred Heart Cathedral was listed on the Queensland Heritage Register on 21 October 1992 having satisfied the following criteria.

The place is important in demonstrating the evolution or pattern of Queensland's history.

Townsville's Sacred Heart Cathedral, erected 1896–1902, is important in illustrating the pattern of Queensland's history, reflecting the struggle of the Catholic Church to secure its position – spiritually, politically and economically – in the frontier towns of 19th century Queensland. That the whole of the original design was never carried out illustrates the fluctuating fortunes of the Catholic Church in North Queensland, as well as the principal turn-of-the-century economic determinants, including the 1890s depression, drought 1900–02, and cyclone Leonta of 1903.

The place is important in demonstrating the principal characteristics of a particular class of cultural places.

Designed to impress, the Sacred Heart Cathedral remains important in demonstrating the principal characteristics of a large brick church incorporating traditional Gothic stylistic elements, yet located in a tropical environment.

The place is important because of its aesthetic significance.

The cathedral occupies a commanding position on Castle Hill overlooking the city, and has strong aesthetic value, contributing significantly to the townscape of Townsville.

The place has a strong or special association with a particular community or cultural group for social, cultural or spiritual reasons.

As a landmark, it has a strong association for the local community, and the place remains a focus of Catholicism in North Queensland. Sacred Heart Cathedral is important also for its association with Catholic worship in Townsville since 1902.
