= Tim Harris (Catholic bishop) =

Australian Latin Catholic bishop (born 1962)

Most Reverend Tim Harris
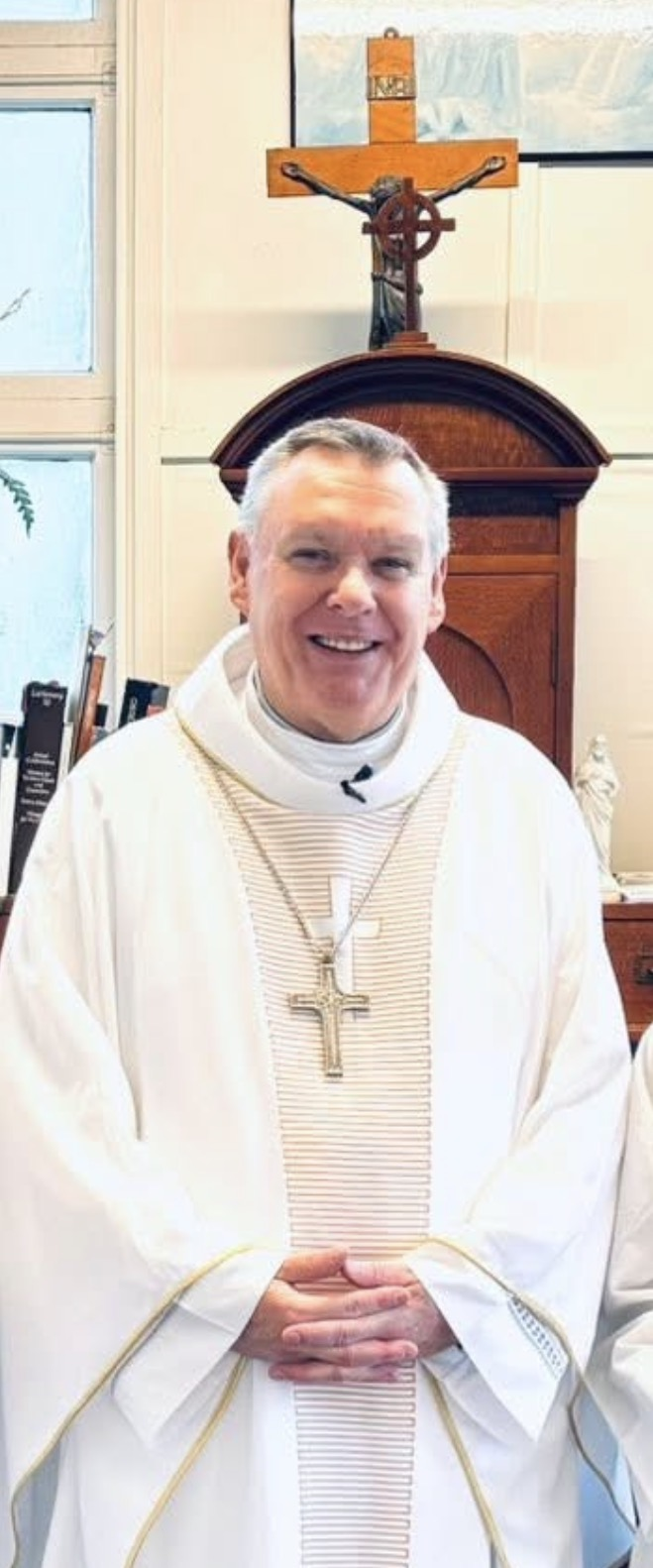

Personal details
- Born: Timothy James Harris; 29 October 1962 (age 63)
- Denomination: Catholic Church
- Occupation: Bishop
- Coat of arms

Timothy James Harris (born 29 October 1962) is an Australian Catholic bishop. He is the Bishop of Townsville in Queensland.

== Early life ==
Harris was born in Brisbane on 29 October 1962 to Shirley and Jim Harris. He has a sister named Jennifer. He was educated at Nundah Convent, Virginia State School and St Joseph's Nudgee College before working for five years as a public relations agent for the Bank of New South Wales.

== Religious life ==
He attained a Bachelor of Theology in 1991; and was subsequently ordained a deacon of the Archdiocese of Brisbane on 5 June 1992, receiving priestly ordination at the age of thirty on 18 November 1992.

Over the almost twenty-five years of his priesthood, he was first an Assistant Pastor in Grovely parish, and then in Caboolture parish; before being appointed parish priest of Corinda-Graceville in 1996, a position in which he served until he was transferred to Surfers Paradise in 2010.

He was appointed as the sixth Bishop of Townsville by Pope Francis on 8 February 2017, following the vacancy since 28 March 2014 when Bishop Michael Putney died in office. His episcopal consecration took place on 3 May 2017.

== Political views ==
In September 2025, Harris published a pastoral letter via The Catholic Leader. In this letter, he acknowledged a swell in public debate in Australia around the subject of immigration, and warned his readers not to "forget the people at the heart of the discussion". Drawing on the recent pastoral letter "Under the Southern Cross: A Journey of Faith and Unity", which itself progresses the themes and restates the mission statement of the pastoral letter from 1850, "On Immigration", Harris restates his support for immigration, noting the enduring relevance of this earlier messaging.

On 16 June 2026, The Townsville Bulletin published an article that quoted an open letter written by Harris wherein he cautioned Liberal MP Phillip Thompson not to support Pauline Hanson's One Nation Party. He referred to One Nation as pursuing a "populist agenda" and characterised the party as being "divisive" and "extremist". He concluded that he "could never support them".

== Personal life ==
His hobbies include Irish music (especially ballads), the beach (having lived at Surfers Paradise for seven years), and sports of all kinds.
