= Holy Spirit Seminary, Brisbane =

Holy Spirit Seminary
- Interactive map of the Holy Spirit Seminary area

General information
- Location: 487 Earnshaw Road, Banyo, Queensland, Australia
- Coordinates: 27.3763°S 153.0862°E

Holy Spirit Seminary is the Catholic provincial seminary for Queensland. Located in Brisbane, Australia, the seminary serves the Catholic province of Queensland and serves the dioceses of Cairns, Rockhampton, Townsville, the Toowoomba, and the Brisbane archdiocese.

== History ==
Holy Spirit Seminary was first founded as Pius XII Provincial Seminary in 1941. Originally it was located on the summit of Beehive Hill in the Brisbane suburb of Banyo. The original buildings were designed by the architectural firm Hennessy & Hennessy, who had also provided the designs used for the Great Court, University of Queensland and the unrealized Holy Name Cathedral, Brisbane. In 2002, due to a decline in vocations. the grounds and buildings of Pius XII Provincial Seminary were leased to the Australian Catholic University to become their Brisbane campus. This led to the seminary relocating to St Paschal's parish in Wavell Heights.

By 2007 a surge of vocations led to the founding of Holy Spirit Seminary by the bishops of Queensland. Located at the foot of Beehive Hill and close to the old seminary, Cardinal William Levada opened the new campus in May 2008. The campus was further extended in 2010 to provide accommodation for another increase in vocations.

Monsignor Anthony Randazzo, a former official of the Congregation for the Doctrine of the Faith, was appointed rector of the seminary at the beginning of 2009.

Monsignor John Grace, formerly vicar general in the Diocese of Rockhampton, was appointed as rector in 2016. Following Grace's departure in 2022, Fr Neil Muir of the Diocese of Cairns succeeded him as rector.

== Community outreach ==
Each year the seminary conducts the Xavier School of Mission for members of all Queensland dioceses. The school aims to "equip and form leaders" in Catholic evangelisation.
