= Palma Rosa =

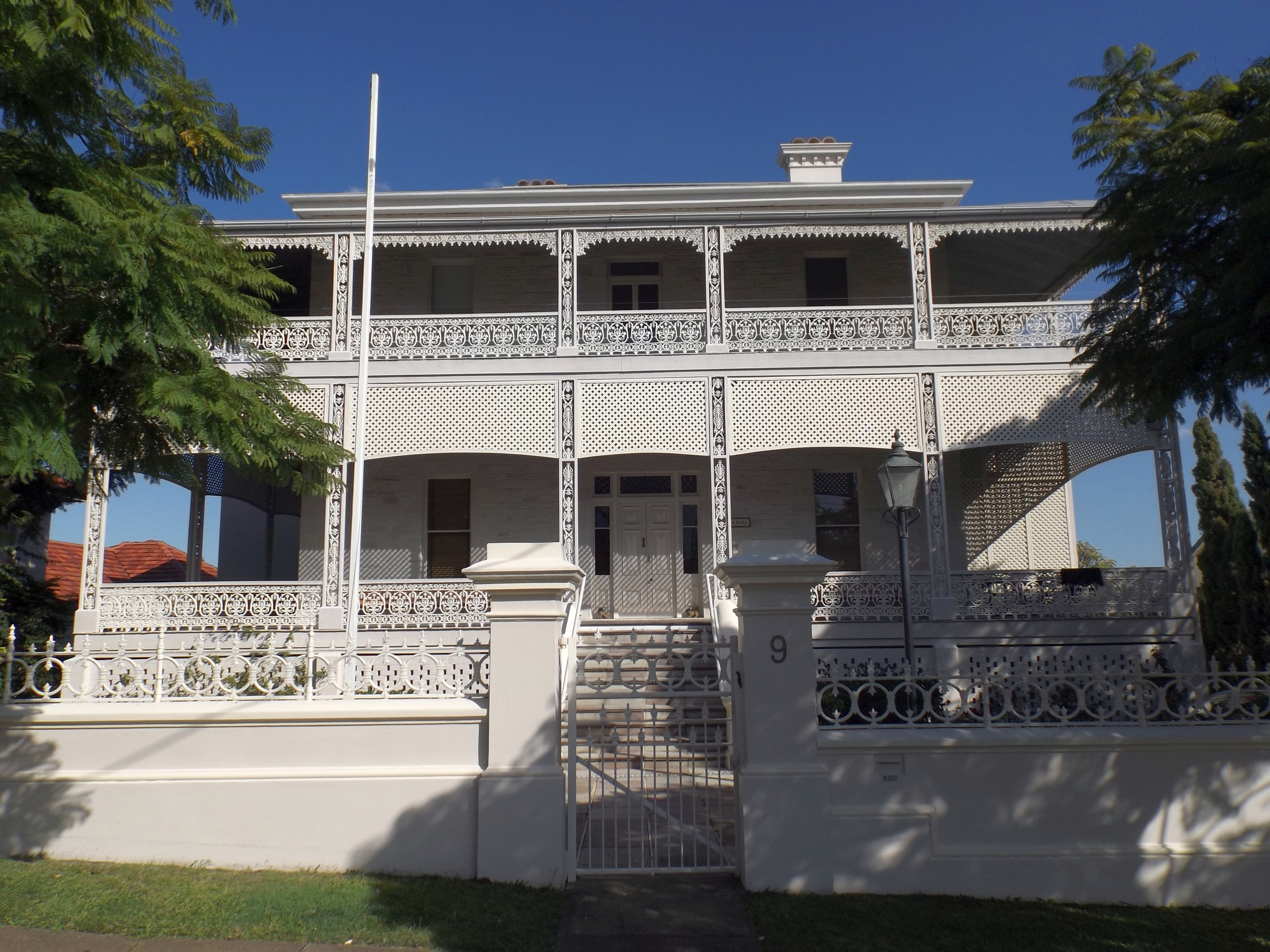
- Residence in 2015

- Location within Queensland Location within Australia
- 27.4361°S 153.0491°E
- Location: 9 Queens Road, Hamilton, City of Brisbane, Queensland, Australia

History
- Design period: 1870s–1890s (late 19th century)
- Built: 1886–1887

Site notes
- Architect: Andrea Stombuco
- Architectural style: Victorian Filigree

Queensland Heritage Register
- Official name: Palma Rosa, Palmerosa/Palmarosa, Sans Souci
- Type: state heritage (built)
- Designated: 21 October 1992
- Reference no.: 600219
- Significant period: 1880s (fabric); 1880s–1940s (historical); 1970s– (social)
- Significant components: tower – observation/lookout, residential accommodation – main house, fence/wall – perimeter

Palma Rosa is a heritage-listed mansion at 9 Queens Road, Hamilton, City of Brisbane, Queensland, Australia. It was designed by Andrea Stombuco and built from 1886 to 1887. It is also known as Palmerosa, Palmarosa, and Sans Souci. It was added to the Queensland Heritage Register on 21 October 1992.

== History ==
Palma Rosa is a three-level sandstone house built in 1886–87, possibly as a speculative venture for, and to the design of, prominent Brisbane architect Andrea Stombuco. It is one of Stombuco's most flamboyant residential designs, erected at the pinnacle of his success in Queensland. Ironically, construction of the building may also have been a strong contributory cause to his near insolvency in the late 1880s/early 1890s.

Andrea Stombuco was an Italian sculptor and builder who had travelled widely and was involved in various business enterprises, including stone quarrying at Cape Town in South Africa, before emigrating to Victoria in 1851. After trying his luck on the goldfields, he established himself in Victoria as a sculptor, monumental mason, builder and architect, and found a patron in the Roman Catholic Church. He was the contractor for a number of Catholic churches in Victoria and for most of the stonework of Ballarat Cathedral, and in 1869 was appointed Architect for the Roman Catholic Diocese of Goulburn in New South Wales.

Stombuco moved to Queensland in 1875 on the advice of Rev. Patrick Dunne of Goulburn, and may have been appointed Catholic Diocesan Architect, receiving a number of important architectural commissions from the Roman Catholic Bishop of Brisbane, James O'Quinn. These included St Joseph's College, Gregory Terrace at Brisbane (1875–76), St Mary's Presbytery at Ipswich (1876), St Francis Xavier Church at Goodna (1880–81), part of All Hallows at Petrie Bight (1880–82) and St Patrick's Church at Fortitude Valley (1880–82). With his eldest son, Giovanni Stombuco, whom he took into partnership in 1886, he also designed St Joseph's Christian Brother's College at Nudgee, erected 1889–90. Among his more prominent non-Catholic works were St Andrew's Anglican Church at South Brisbane (1878–83) and Her Majesty's Opera House in Queen Street (1885–88).

Stombuco designed a number of large houses in Brisbane, including Friedenthal (1886–87) at Eagle Farm for WH Heckelman; and Rhyndarra (1889) at Yeronga for W Williams. He also designed several speculative ventures for himself, including Bertholme at New Farm (now the Moreton Club). When Queensland's boom economy crashed in 1890, Stombuco was forced to auction his then residence, Briar House - a more modest residence in Lechmere Street, New Farm, which he had erected in 1888 - and left Queensland for Perth, Western Australia in 1891. His wife and son remained in Queensland, but Stombuco never returned, and died in Perth in 1907. Giovanni Stombuco retired from architecture when his father left Queensland in 1891, moving with his mother to Spring Vale Farm at Kuraby.

Whether Palma Rosa (originally named Sans Souci -'without care') was built as a speculative venture, or whether it was intended as the Stombuco family home, is not clear. If the Stombucos occupied the house, it was very briefly. The house was completed by mid-December 1887, when Stombuco hosted an entertainment at Sans Souci to mark the completion of the building, but from 1888 to 1891, when he left the colony, the Queensland Post Office Directories list Stombuco's private residence as Lechmere Street, New Farm.

Stombuco had obtained title to the Sans Souci site in 1886. At that time it comprised 3 roods 19.2 perches (3,520 m^{2}), and was part of the Toorak Estate subdivision. The house was designed in 1886, the year Giovanni Stombuco entered into partnership with his father, but it is not known to what extent he contributed to the design. The house was constructed in 1886–87 by Brisbane contractors JAM O'Keeffe (who possibly had the overall supervision), A Petrie (who supplied the stone) and J Watson (presumably of the plumbing firm Watson Brothers), and builders Bell & McLaughlan.

On completion in late 1887, Sans Souci was described in the local press as undoubtedly one of the finest residences in or about Brisbane. The building was of three storeys, and constructed of stone from Petrie's Quarry (probably the nearby Petrie's Quarry, on the northern side of Crosby Road). The rooms were all generously proportioned, with elaborate French-polished joinery and highly decorative cornices and ceiling roses in the principal rooms. The main hallway was decorated with an arch supported by fluted columns with corinthian capitals, and had tessellated Minton tiles on the floor. Sicilian marble was used for the steps at the front door and at the porch entrance, and for most of the mantelpieces, which also had Minton tiles in the hearths.

Original plans indicate that the sub-floor contained a generous L-shaped dining room, kitchen, scullery, pantry and servant's room; the piano nobile contained a drawing room and library (connected by folding doors) over the dining room, a boudoir and two bedrooms on the east side of the hall, and a main staircase off the vestibule to the west; and the upper floor accommodated 5 bedrooms and a bathroom. The three floor plans virtually replicated each other, and included a generous hall, 10 feet (3.0 m) wide, running centrally north-south on each level. Initially, verandahs across the whole of the southern and western elevations were intended, but only sections of these appear to have been built.

In September 1888, Stombuco took out a mortgage of £4,500 on Sans Souci from the Queensland Investment and Land Mortgage Company, of which Sir Arthur Hunter Palmer, Premier of Queensland from May 1870 to January 1874, was a director and principal shareholder. Even before Stombuco left Queensland in 1891, it appears that the mortgage company controlled the property, although Stombuco technically retained title until 1913. The house was clearly a rental property by 1890, at which time it was known as Palmerosa, and was occupied briefly (c. 1889-90) by prominent Brisbane jeweller Lewis Flegeltaub, who had moved to Newstead House by 1891. Through the 1890s and early 1900s, Palmarosa was home to a number of socially prominent people and their families, including Joseph Bennett (possibly a Fassifern grazier) 1892–93; Reginald E. Finlay (manager of the Queensland Investment and Land Mortgage Company) c. 1894-97; Captain T. M. Almond (Queensland portmaster 1890–1902) in the late 1890s; and William Hood, MLA, in the early 1900s.

From c. 1904 to c. 1934, the principal occupant was Arthur Cecil Hunter Palmer, a civil engineer and second son of Sir Arthur Hunter Palmer. ACH (Cecil) Palmer and his wife, Lorna Barron, appear to have settled at Palmarosa within a year or so of their marriage in August 1902, and in 1913 title to the property was transferred to Mr Palmer. The Palmers were well known in Brisbane society for their race-day verandah parties at Palmarosa, overlooking the Albion Park Raceway, with "bookies" said to have visited the house to take bets. By 1932 the house had been divided into three flats, with the Palmers occupying the top floor. During the Second World War, Palmarosa was occupied by United States military personnel from 1942 to c. 1945.

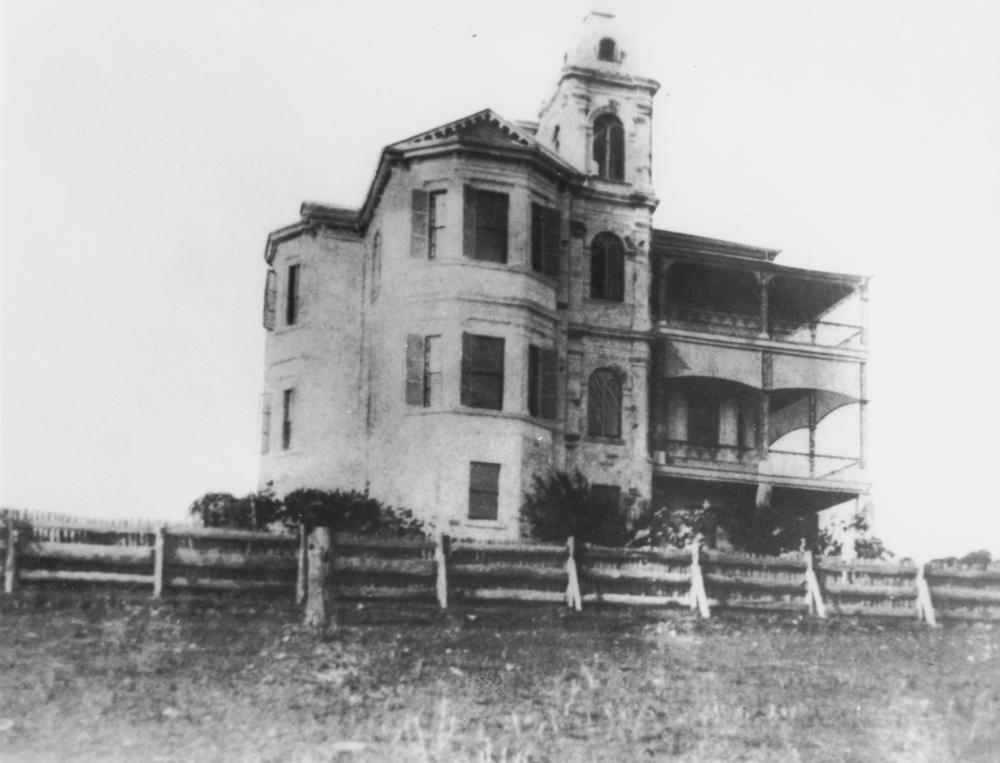
Back view of Palma Rosa

The house remained in the Palmer family until title passed in 1945 to Charles Robinson, then to Charles Lawrence Hayles in 1946. In 1951 the residence was converted to a boarding house – several of its residents later became prominent, including Sir William Knox and several judges - and Hayles subdivided the property in 1954. Title to the house block was transferred a number of times in the 1950s, and in the late 1950s or early 1960s the place was converted to a private convalescence hospital. By September 1963 the verandahs had been removed and additional toilets installed for hospital use. Also by this date, the name Palma Rosa was being spelt as two words.

In 1972 the property, on a reduced site of just over 1 rood (11,000 sq ft; 1,000 m^{2}) was bought at auction by Ralph Holden on behalf of the English Speaking Union (ESU), a Queensland branch of which he had established in Brisbane in 1968. The ESU, based in London, is an educational, cultural and social society advocating English as an international means of communication. There are a number of branches of the ESU in Australia and in many other nations, but few own property.

Since 1972 Palma Rosa has functioned as club rooms and art gallery for the ESU's Queensland branch. In 1975 a new deed of grant was issued to The English Speaking Union (Queensland Branch), in which the Hamilton land was granted to the Union and its successors Upon Trust for Buildings (Preservation of Historic Heritage) purposes. In the early 1980s the Union installed a resident caretaker at Palma Rosa, a role which later was taken by the president of the English Speaking Union in Queensland, Patricia Johnson, and her family. Repair works for the ESU were undertaken at Palma Rosa between 1972 and the mid-1980s, including reconstruction of the verandahs, and in 1996–97 the Union commissioned a substantial conservation report on the building.

By 2010, the ESU sold the property at auction for $3.715 million to a local family who planned to restore the property. The auction was hampered by disruptive actions by some members of the ESU who objected to the sale. In July 2010, the ESU purchased another heritage-listed property at Cook Terrace in Milton.

== Description ==
Palma Rosa is located on a hillside block at Hamilton overlooking the Albion Park Racecourse and Breakfast Creek. From the racecourse, the house is the most prominent building in the landscape, and possesses considerable landmark value.

Palma Rosa is a large sandstone residence arranged on three levels (two storeys and a full sub-floor) and has an attached 5 level tower, from the upper level of which there are fine vistas of the Bulimba and Hamilton Reaches of the Brisbane River. The windows on the fourth level of the tower have been filled in.

The building has a hipped roof, the outer faces of which are clad with slate tiles and the inner with "panel deck". There are double-storeyed, early 1980s, reconstructed verandahs across the northern (front) and eastern elevations, returning around the southern (rear) elevation to end at a tower. On the western elevation the original verandahs have been enclosed to provide toilets/bathrooms. There is a 3-level, projecting faceted bay, on both the southern and western sides of the building. These take advantage of the vistas over the racecourse to Breakfast Creek and the Brisbane River beyond. The front of the building addresses Queens Road to the north. The principal entrance is via a flight of centrally-positioned front steps leading to the piano nobile.

Internally the house comprises 15 main rooms on 3 levels, with a wide vestibule/hallway running centrally north-south through the house on each level. The floor plans of all 3 levels are almost identical. The principal rooms on the ground and first floor are over 4 metres (13 ft) in height and have decorative plaster cornices which are perforated or undercut, and perforated ceiling roses (these appear to have been designed to ventilate to the roof or floor cavity above). There is extensive use of cedar joinery throughout, including panelled reveals and carved transoms to the doorways. The hallway on the principal level has tessellated tiles on the floor and corinthian pilasters to the archway separating hall from vestibule. There are 8 fireplaces with marble surrounds and tiles to the hearths, as well as the kitchen flue.

The house occupies most of the 1,181-square-metre (12,710 sq ft) block, with a few trees and shrubs along the side boundaries and a small lawn at the rear. There is little original planting. Across the front of the property is a masonry and cast-iron fence.

== Heritage listing ==
Palma Rosa was listed on the Queensland Heritage Register on 21 October 1992 having satisfied the following criteria.

The place is important in demonstrating the evolution or pattern of Queensland's history.

Palma Rosa, erected in 1887 on a scale and finish unusual even in Brisbane's more substantial 19th century homes, is important in illustrating the confidence in the 1880s boom which re-shaped Queensland's economic environment, and created a building boom in Brisbane.

The place demonstrates rare, uncommon or endangered aspects of Queensland's cultural heritage.

Palma Rosa, erected in 1887 on a scale and finish unusual even in Brisbane's more substantial 19th century homes, is important in illustrating the confidence in the 1880s boom which re-shaped Queensland's economic environment, and created a building boom in Brisbane.

The place is important in demonstrating the principal characteristics of a particular class of cultural places.

It is an example of the domestic work of prominent Brisbane architect Andrea Giovanni Stombuco and is a good example of an 1880s elite residence in Queensland.

The place is important because of its aesthetic significance.

The ornately decorated interior, reflective of the architect's flamboyant taste, is of strong aesthetic value.

The place has a strong or special association with a particular community or cultural group for social, cultural or spiritual reasons.

The place has landmark value, and has had a special association for the English Speaking Union as their Brisbane club rooms since 1972.

The place has a special association with the life or work of a particular person, group or organisation of importance in Queensland's history.

The place has landmark value, and has had a special association for the English Speaking Union as their Brisbane club rooms since 1972.
