= St Andrew's Anglican Church, South Brisbane =

St Andrews Anglican Church, South Brisbane
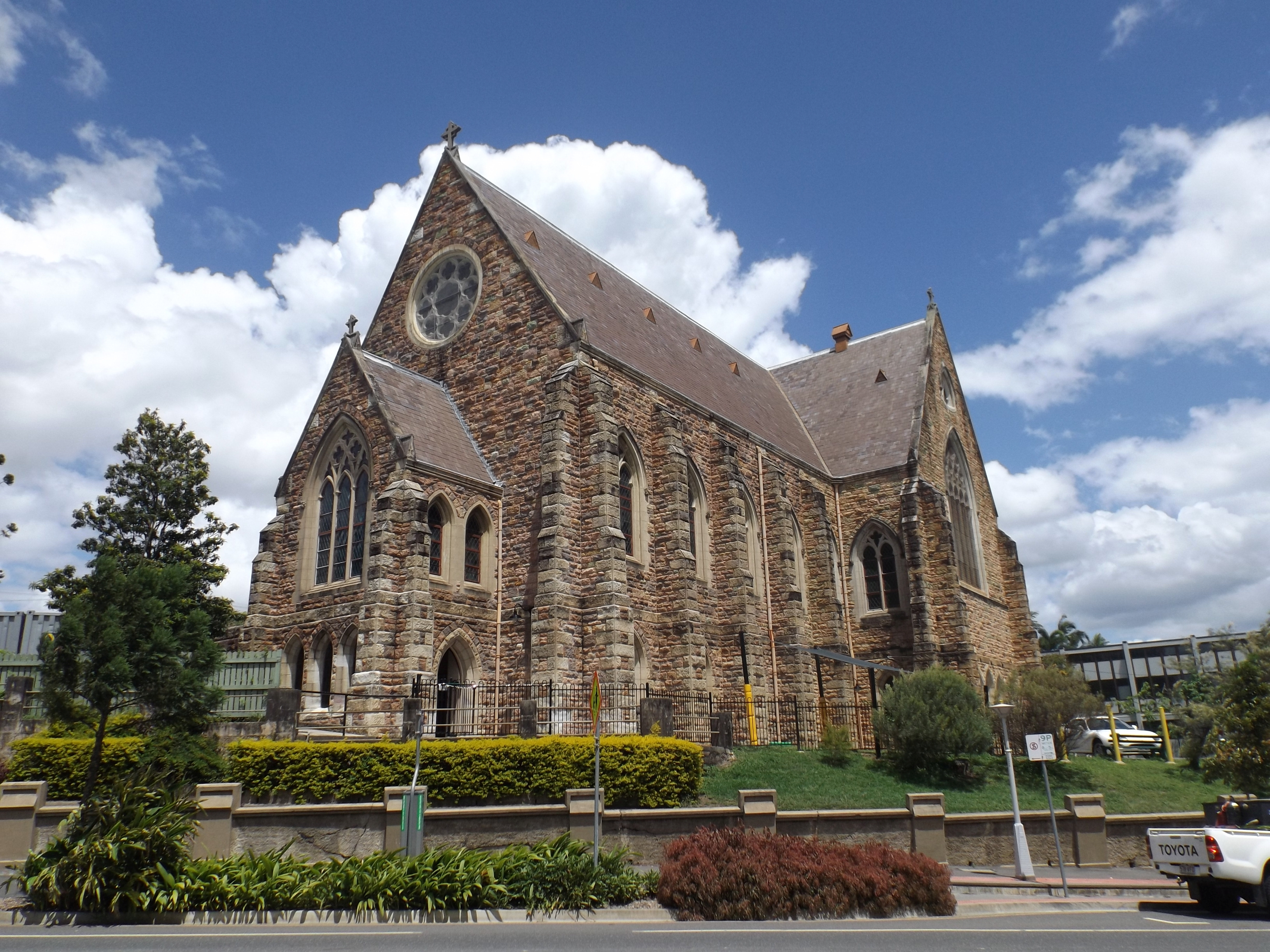
- St Andrew Anglican Church, 2015

- Location within Queensland
- 27.4815°S 153.0194°E
- Location: 160 Vulture Street, South Brisbane, City of Brisbane, Queensland, Australia

History
- Design period: 1870s–1890s (late 19th century)
- Built: 1878–1932

Site notes
- Architect: Andrea Stombuco
- Architectural style: Gothic Revival

Queensland Heritage Register
- Official name: St Andrews Anglican Church
- Type: state heritage (built)
- Designated: 21 October 1992
- Reference no.: 600304
- Significant period: 1878, 1882–1883, 1887, 1909, 1931–1932 (fabric)
- Significant components: church, stained glass window/s, furniture/fittings, hall

St Andrew's Anglican Church is a heritage-listed churchyard at 160 Vulture Street, South Brisbane, City of Brisbane, Queensland, Australia. It was designed by Andrea Stombuco and built from 1878 to 1932. It was added to the Queensland Heritage Register on 21 October 1992.

== History ==
The church was constructed in several stages: 1878–1883, 1887, and 1931–1932, as funds became progressively available.

The first Anglican church in South Brisbane, St Thomas', had been built c. 1855 on the corner of Grey and Melbourne Streets. The construction of St Andrew's reflected the growing population of the area and the general move of residential and public buildings up the hill away from the flood-prone area of first settlement. Flamboyant Italian architect Andrea Stombuco was commissioned to design St Andrew's, which was to be a substantial structure in stone. Stombuco, who had designed a number of ecclesiastical buildings for the Catholic Church, including St Joseph's Christian Brothers' College on Gregory Terrace (1875–1876), Rathbawn (a house built for Roman Catholic Bishop of Brisbane, James Quinn) at Nudgee (1875–1878) and St Mary's Roman Catholic Presbytery in Ipswich (1875), envisaged a grand structure for St Andrew's, with a prominent tower and spire.

The foundation stone for St Andrew's was laid on Saturday 30 November 1878 by Queensland Governor Arthur Kennedy. Work commenced in 1878, but was abandoned when the walls had reached a height of only 6 feet (1.8 m). Stombuco's design had proved beyond the financial means of the parish, and work did not resume until 1882. The chancel, transepts and first bay of the nave were completed in the following year by the builder James O'Keeffe. The church was officially opened and dedicated on Wednesday 6 June 1883 by Bishop Matthew Hale assisted by Archdeacon Benjamin Glennie with over 500 people present.

An 1887 extension was designed by architect Hezekiah Watson King Martin, who had recently arrived in Brisbane from London, and was an active member of the St Andrew's congregation. Also in 1887, architect John H. Buckeridge designed the rectory for St Andrew’s Church and also extensions to it in 1892. The rectory was later relocated to 112 Airlie Road, Pullenvale and is used as a private home. The parish hall was built in 1909 to a design by architect William Alfred Caldwell. The continued growth in the congregation led to the completion of the nave in 1931–1932, under the supervision of architect Lange Leopold Powell. The tower and spire of Stombuco's design were never completed.

St Andrews Anglican Church was listed on the Queensland Heritage Register on 21 October 1992 due to its contribution to the townscape, historic significance and rarity as a substantial stone Gothic church in Brisbane.

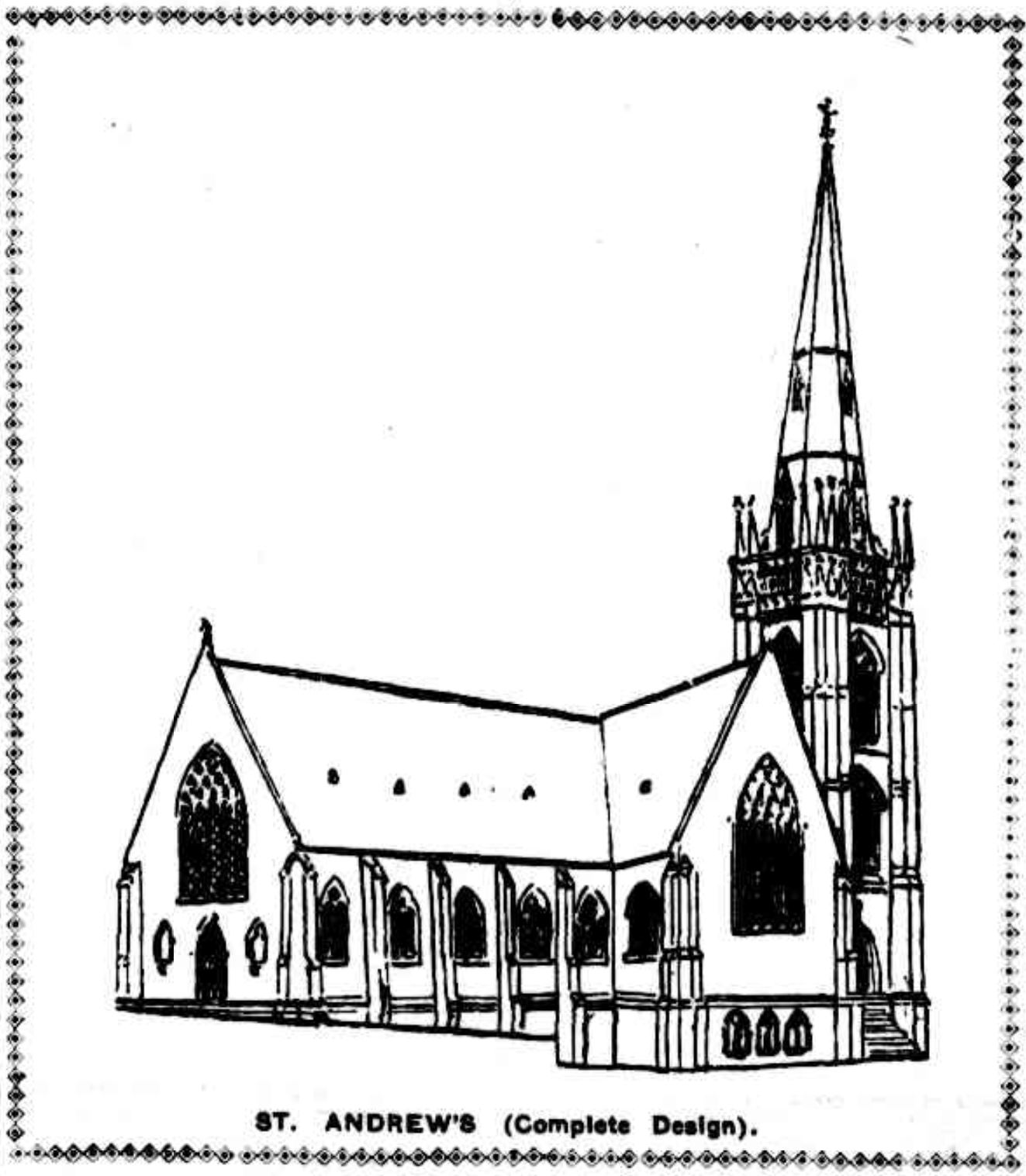
Stombuco's original design included a tower and spire, which were never built

== Description ==
St Andrew's is a large Gothic-style church, cruciform in shape and made of Brisbane tuff.

In addition to the nave and transepts there is a portico at the front and a chancel at the western end. Both of these wings have a lower roof line than the nave. A small vestry is located to the north of the chancel and the half-built tower is to the south. There is a substantial subfloor beneath the church. The steeply pitched gable roof is of slate.

A notable feature of the building is the large stained glass windows, especially those located at the end of the chancel, portico and transepts.

The timber hall consists of a core surrounded by enclosed verandah wings. The core has a steeply pitched gable roof in corrugated iron and fine timber ceiling supported by timber trusses.
