= St Francis Xavier Church, Goodna =

Roman Catholic church in Ipswich, Queensland, Australia

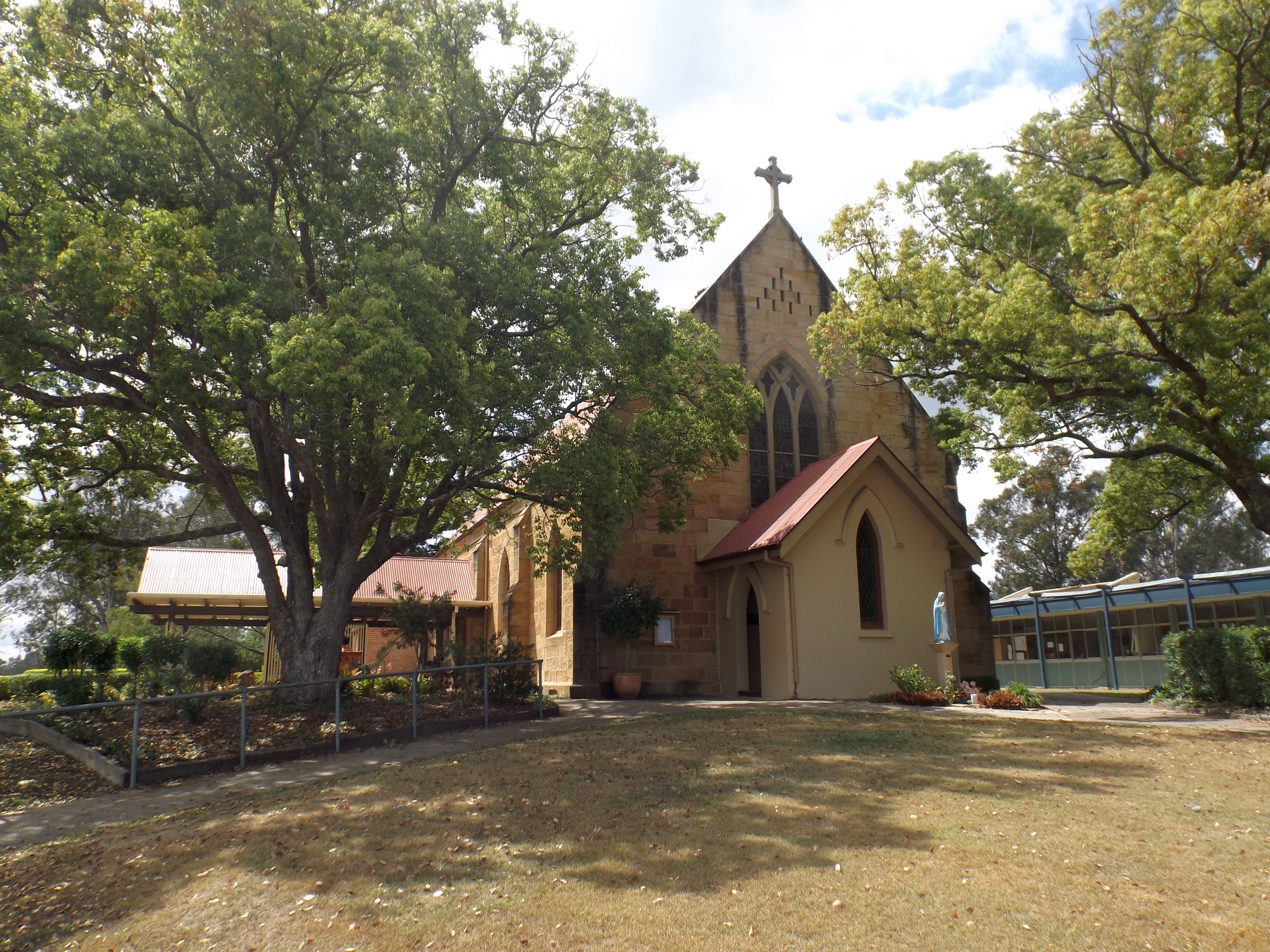
- St Francis Xavier Church in 2015
- St Francis Xavier Church, Goodna
- 27°36′38″S 152°53′58″E
- Address: 6 Church Street, Goodna, City of Ipswich, Queensland
- Country: Australia
- Denomination: Roman Catholic
- Website: stfrancisxavierparish.com

History
- Former name: St Patrick's Church
- Status: Church
- Founded: 15 August 1880
- Founder: Bishop James Quinn
- Dedication: Saint Patrick (1880–c. 1920s); Saint Francis Xavier (c. 1920s)

Architecture
- Functional status: Active
- Architect: Andrea Giovanni Stombuco
- Architectural type: Church
- Style: Gothic Revival
- Years built: 1881–1980s
- Completed: 1 May 1881

Specifications
- Materials: Sandstone; corrugated galvanised iron

Administration
- Archdiocese: Brisbane
- Parish: Ipswich

Queensland Heritage Register
- Official name: St Francis Xavier Church, St Patrick's Church
- Type: State heritage (built)
- Designated: 21 October 1992
- Reference no.: 600553
- Significant period: 1881, 1915, 1980s (fabric)
- Significant components: Memorial – plaque, memorial – statue, stained glass window/s, memorial – window, gate – entrance, trees/plantings
- Builders: William Hanley

St Francis Xavier Church is a heritage-listed Roman Catholic church at 6 Church Street, Goodna, City of Ipswich, Queensland, Australia. It was designed by Andrea Giovanni Stombuco and built in 1881 by William Hanley. It was originally known as St Patrick's Church. It was added to the Queensland Heritage Register on 21 October 1992.

== History ==
St Francis Xavier Church was designed by architect Andrea Stombuco. The foundation stone for St Patrick's (as it was originally called) was laid on Sunday 15 August 1880 by Bishop of Brisbane James Quinn. The church was opened in Sunday 1 May 1881 by Bishop Quinn. Two major series of extensions and renovations have been made, the first by architects R. Coutts and Sons in 1915 and the second by Hubert van Hoo in the 1980s.

Construction of the church is well-documented. Local stone came from a nearby quarry, believed to be in Stuart Street; parishioners carted the stone to the site as voluntary work. Most masonry work was carried out by William Hanley but was finished by day labour. Carpentry and painting were carried out by James Madden of Ipswich. The cedar was from Doorey's sawmill at [ount Mistake, and other timber from Reillys and Hancocks of Ipswich. The original front cedar door was painted red and the interior was entirely plastered, except for the ceiling which was lined with "Rosewood pine" painted dark blue. The original roof was Gospel Oak iron.

The church was a substantial one; apart from St Mary's in Ipswich, other Catholic churches built in the Ipswich region at that time were simpler buildings of timber.

The church was originally part of Ipswich parish but became a separate parish in 1892, the first priest being Fr Thomas Hayes. A school was started in 1910 and a convent was built in 1911 for Sisters of Mercy who taught at the school. The convent, a two-storey timber building, is still standing in Church Street opposite St Francis Xavier Church. A timber presbytery was built in the 1890s but demolished c. 1980; its position is marked by a flat area encircled by trees immediately to the west of the current brick presbytery.

The church was renovated and extended in 1915 by contractor J.C. Hobbs of Brisbane, to a design by R Coutts and Sons. The main change was construction of a new apse of brick and two side sacristies; to connect the apse, an arch was cut in the stonework of the rear wall. Two side windows of the church were converted into double doors and the remaining six pairs were altered to allow them to be openable. A new altar rail was installed and a new porch was added at the front, floored in black-and-white tile and containing a leadlight window by Extons. The foundations were strengthened and the walls were tied with iron plates running the length of the building on each side. At this time, two major stained glass windows were installed in the side walls, one in memory of local school teacher John Carroll and the other in memory of Denis Gorman.

The triple window on the western wall and other fittings, Stations of the Cross paintings and statues within the church are also memorials.

The name of the church was changed to St Francis Xavier in the 1920s, apparently to avoid confusion as so many churches were named St Patrick's.

Further changes occurred in the 1970s and 80s, prompted by changing liturgy and changing patterns of church-going. Externally, a light timber structure was built at the northern side entrance to provide a place where the congregation could gather after a service. This was designed by parishioner and local architect Hubert van Hoof. The building was also repaired at this time, including installation of a new floor.

Internally, there have been numerous changes to the sanctuary area following the liturgical changes of the Second Vatican Council; the altar was moved and later reduced in size, and the altar rail was removed. The gallery at the western end has been removed. The current pews are not original, but were recently acquired from another church. New silky oak altar furniture was designed by architect Hubert van Hoof.

== Description ==
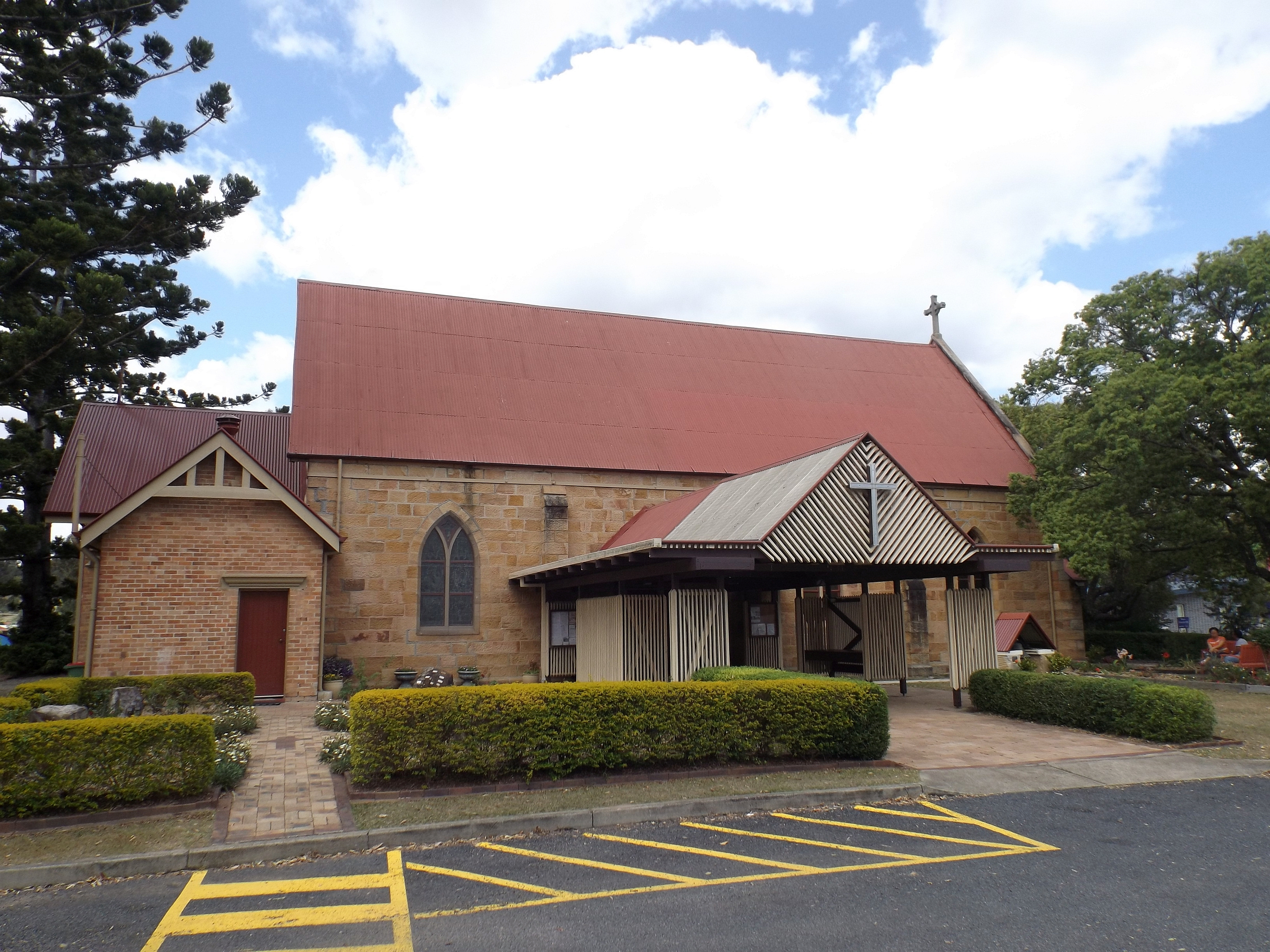
Side view, 2015

St Francis Xavier is a traditional cruciform-plan Gothic Revival church of sandstone with steep gabled roof forms clad in corrugated galvanised iron.

The western end has a small gabled entrance porch floored in black and white tiles, while the eastern end has an extended sanctuary and twin sacristies in brickwork. A contemporary timber-framed northern entry porch gives access from the carpark to the centre of the nave. Windows are of pointed arch design, some of which contain fine quality stained and coloured glass memorials.

The nave is dominated by the large archway leading to the extended sanctuary. The raised sanctuary floor has been extended westward into the nave. Niches each side of the archway contain religious statues. The painted boarded ceiling follows the collar-tie roof form and exhibits steel tie-rod and roof bracing.

The church pews are benches in light-coloured timber, low-backed and dating from possibly the 1970s. Other furniture includes a small timber altar of earlier date as well as new altar furniture in light-coloured silky oak (designed by architect Hubert van Hoof).

The walls of the nave display paintings showing the Stations of the Cross and a memorial tablet honouring the first Parish Priest Fr Hayes. On the exterior walls above window height along each side is a steel strap extending the length of the stone work.

The church is complemented by a parkland setting of mature trees, most notably tall hoop pines to the north, east and west. Early church entrance gates have survived at the Church Street boundary in front of the church.

New school buildings are situated close to the southern side of the church and a c. 1980 brick presbytery and church office are situated to the north-east. These are not included within the heritage listing.

== Heritage listing ==
St Francis Xavier Church was listed on the Queensland Heritage Register on 21 October 1992 having satisfied the following criteria.

The place is important in demonstrating the evolution or pattern of Queensland's history.

The place demonstrates the pattern of development of the Goodna township and the desire of the Catholic community of the area in the 1880s to build a substantial local church

The place is important in demonstrating the principal characteristics of a particular class of cultural places.

It is a good example of a Revival Gothic stone church of simple traditional form.

The place is important because of its aesthetic significance.

The church is prominently located near the major shopping area of Goodna and, with its setting of mature trees, has landmark qualities and contributes aesthetically to the streetscape.

The place has a strong or special association with a particular community or cultural group for social, cultural or spiritual reasons.

It has had a strong association with the spiritual, social and educational life of the Goodna community since its construction in 1881.

The place has a special association with the life or work of a particular person, group or organisation of importance in Queensland's history.

It was built to the design of important architect Andrea Stombuco.
