= Bertholme =

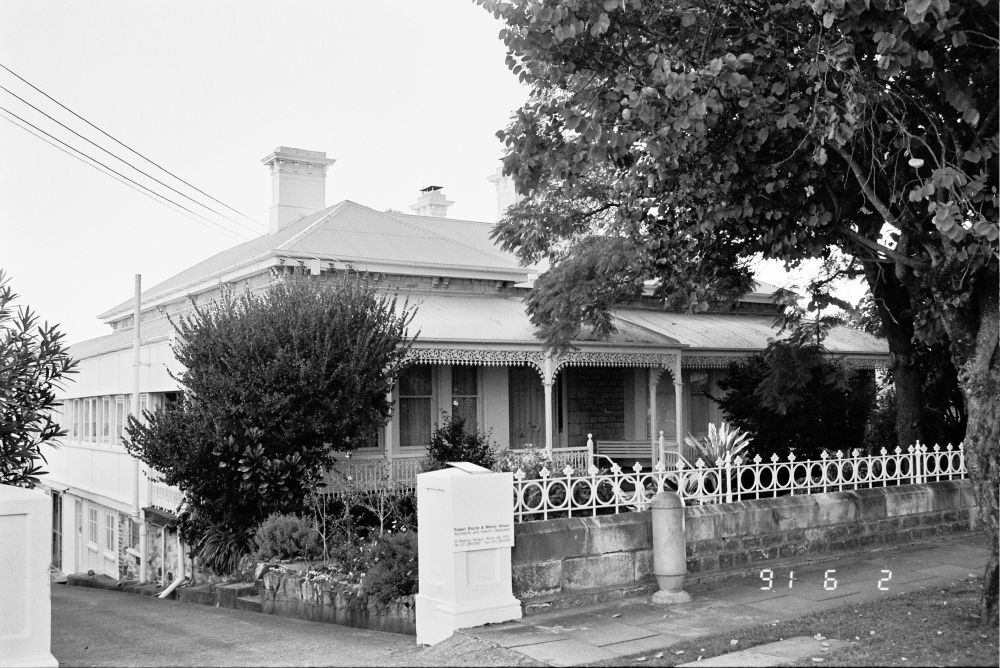
- Bertholme, 1991

- Location within Queensland Location within Australia
- 27.4664°S 153.0404°E
- Location: 71–73 Moray Street, New Farm, City of Brisbane, Queensland, Australia

History
- Design period: 1870s–1890s (late 19th century)
- Built: 1882–1883

Site notes
- Architect: Andrea Giovanni Stombuco
- Architectural style: Victorian Filigree

Queensland Heritage Register
- Official name: Bertholme, Moreton Club
- Type: state heritage (built)
- Designated: 21 October 1992
- Reference no.: 600263
- Significant period: 1880s (fabric); 1880s–1890s (historical); 1958– (social)
- Significant components: gate – entrance, fence/wall – perimeter, residential accommodation – main house, basement / sub-floor

Bertholme is a heritage-listed detached house at 71–73 Moray Street, New Farm, City of Brisbane, Queensland, Australia. It was designed by Andrea Giovanni Stombuco and built from 1882 to 1883. It is also known as the Moreton Club. It was added to the Queensland Heritage Register on 21 October 1992.

== History ==
The land on which Bertholme stands was acquired in 1882 by Andrea Stombuco, the noted architect in Brisbane from 1875 to 1890–90, who also built Palma Rosa and designed Her Majesty's Opera House, Brisbane (1888). The house appears to have been erected sometime in the following three years, for it was standing when Stombuco sold the property in 1885 to Giovanni Pulle, an Italian merchant.

Five months later, the property was bought by BD Cohen. He sold it in the 1890s to his brother Henry Cohen, manager of the pharmaceutical firm of Elliot Brothers, who named it Bertholme in honour of his wife, Bertha. After the Cohens left Bertholme at the turn of the century, the land was subdivided, while the house became the residence of a succession of professional men. Miss Jane Ingram bought the property in 1939, and converted it into a nursing home. In 1958, the Moreton Club acquired Bertholme and much of the subdivided land from the original estate. They have built extensive additions on the rear of the house and refurbished it to suit their requirements.

== Description ==
Bertholme is a substantial single-storey residence built of sandstone. Its hipped roof, originally slate, is now of corrugated iron. Square in shape, but with a bay projecting slightly at the front, the house is surrounded by a convex roofed verandah.

Built on the sloping riverbank, the house is lowset at the front and highset at the rear, creating a subfloor underneath. The back and side verandahs have been enclosed with weatherboards and only the front verandah retains its original decorative cast-iron balusters, posts and valance. The subfloor has been similarly enclosed, and a highset kitchen house projecting over the driveway at the rear is walled in the same material. A long modern double storey wing at the rear is joined to the house by a shorter wing at the northern end, creating a paved courtyard.

== Heritage listing ==
Bertholme was listed on the Queensland Heritage Register on 21 October 1992 having satisfied the following criteria.

The place is important in demonstrating the evolution or pattern of Queensland's history.

As a rare surviving example of the type of riverside residences built in New Farm in the late nineteenth century.

For its unpainted stone walls and decorative front fence which give the house a distinctive texture and an impression of strength.

As the home of the Moreton Club, Brisbane's premier private club for women.

For its association with Andrea Stombuco, the first owner and one of Brisbane's most flamboyant architects of the 1880s boom period.

The place is important in demonstrating the principal characteristics of a particular class of cultural places.

As a rare surviving example of the type of riverside residences built in New Farm in the late nineteenth century.

The place is important because of its aesthetic significance.

For its unpainted stone walls and decorative front fence which give the house a distinctive texture and an impression of strength.

The place has a strong or special association with a particular community or cultural group for social, cultural or spiritual reasons.

As the home of the Moreton Club, Brisbane's premier private club for women.

The place has a special association with the life or work of a particular person, group or organisation of importance in Queensland's history.

As the home of the Moreton Club, Brisbane's premier private club for women.

For its association with Andrea Stombuco, the first owner and one of Brisbane's most flamboyant architects of the 1880s boom period.
