= Heckelmanns Building =

Heritage-listed building in Brisbane, Queensland

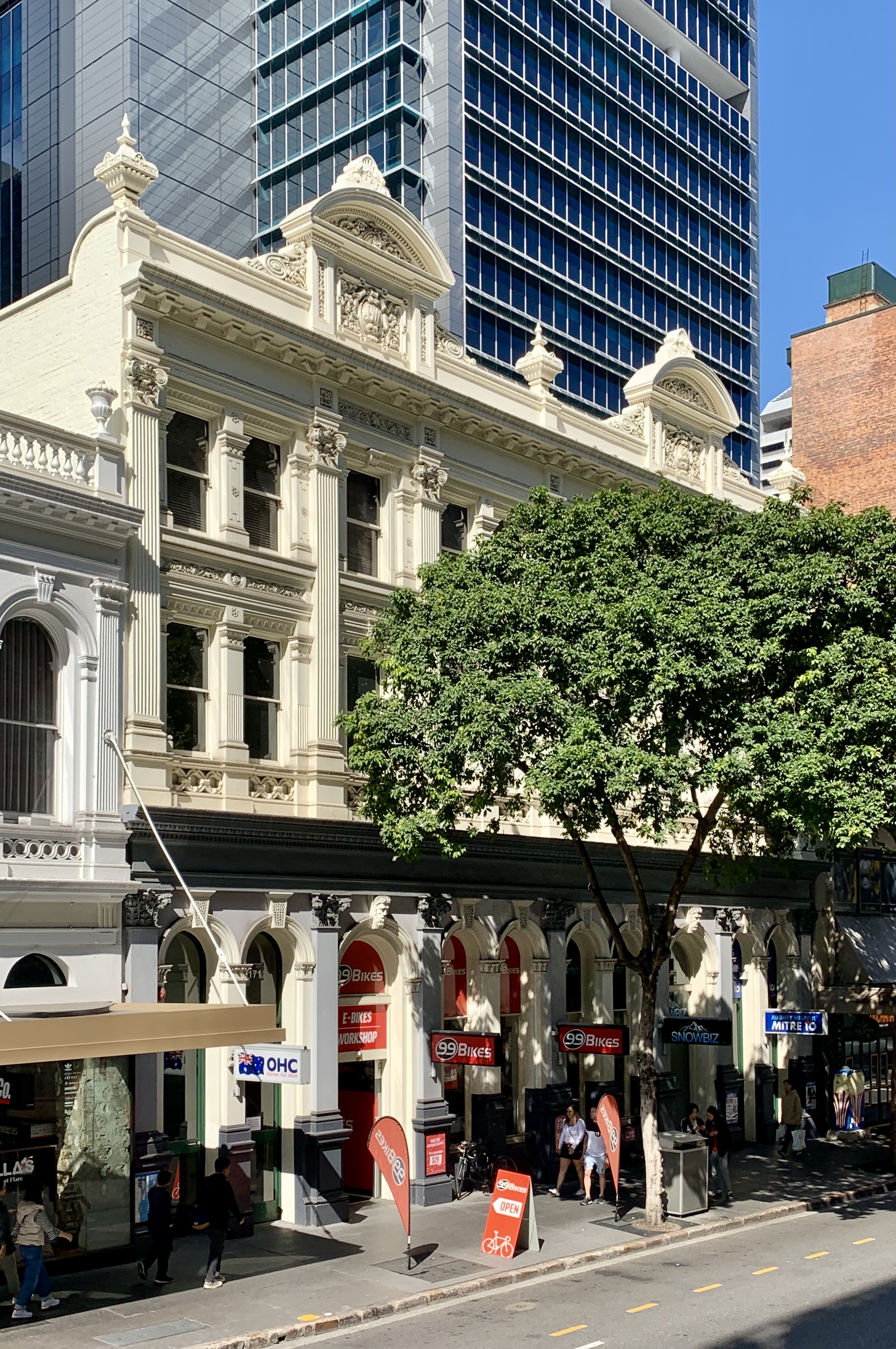
- Heckelmanns Building, 2019

- Location within Queensland Location within Australia
- 27.47°S 153.027°E
- Location: 171 Elizabeth Street, Brisbane City, City of Brisbane, Queensland, Australia

History
- Design period: 1870s–1890s (late 19th century)
- Built: 1884–1891

Site notes
- Architect: Andrea Giovanni Stombuco

Queensland Heritage Register
- Official name: Heckelmanns Building
- Type: state heritage (built)
- Designated: 21 October 1992
- Reference no.: 600104
- Significant period: 1884, 1891 (fabric); 1884–1951 (historical)
- Builders: W Watson

Heckelmanns Building is a heritage-listed warehouse at 171 Elizabeth Street, Brisbane City, City of Brisbane, Queensland, Australia. It was designed by Andrea Giovanni Stombuco and built from 1884 to 1891. It was added to the Queensland Heritage Register on 21 October 1992.

== History ==
In July 1873, Joseph Wendelin Heckelmann purchased 36 perches (910 m^{2}) in Elizabeth Street from which he subdivided 2.4 perches (61 m^{2}) in 1878. In 1884 he erected a two storeyed business premises with cellars which Arthur S and Leopold S Benjamin, merchants, occupied and opened on 22 October 1884. A seven-year lease between the Benjamin Brothers and Heckelmann was formalised from September of that year at an annual rate of £500. The premises, which cost £6,000 were designed by architect Andrea Stombuco and erected by W Watson. Built of stone and brick with a stuccoed facade, the building had a frontage of 66 feet (20 m) to Elizabeth Street and a depth of 80 feet (24 m). A mechanical lift was incorporated in the building.

Alterations occurred c. 1888, but the majority of the building was destroyed by fire in December 1890. Using the original foundations and the ground floor facade, the building was re-erected in 1891 to a height of three storeys excluding basement. It is thought that architect John Jacob Cohen may have been responsible for the design of the renovations. Joseph Heckelmann caused his initials and the date of reconstruction to be noted in the frieze below each pediment. Heckelmann, a tinsmith by trade, was an alderman of the Hamilton Town Council at the time, having been elected in 1890. Benjamin Brothers did not re-establish in the building but long-term tenants such as soft goods manufacturer J Leutenegger occupied the site from 1895 to 1934. Leutenegger was also Swiss Consul for a time and the consulate office was in this building.

Joseph Heckelmann died in 1925 and the ownership passed to his family. In April 1951 the building was purchased by the Commercial Bank of Australia for £50,000 and continued to be leased. It was subdivided in 1963 and two years later one half of the building was bought by Kenneth Rosewall and Rodney G Laver, noted Australian sportsmen. The other portion remained in the hands of the Commercial Bank and its successor Westpac Banking Corporation. Kern Corporation subsequently became the owner of the entire building.

=== Street name ===
A number of street names in the Brisbane suburb of Carina Heights are identical to the surnames of prominent Queenslanders. One of these is Hecklemann Street.

== Description ==
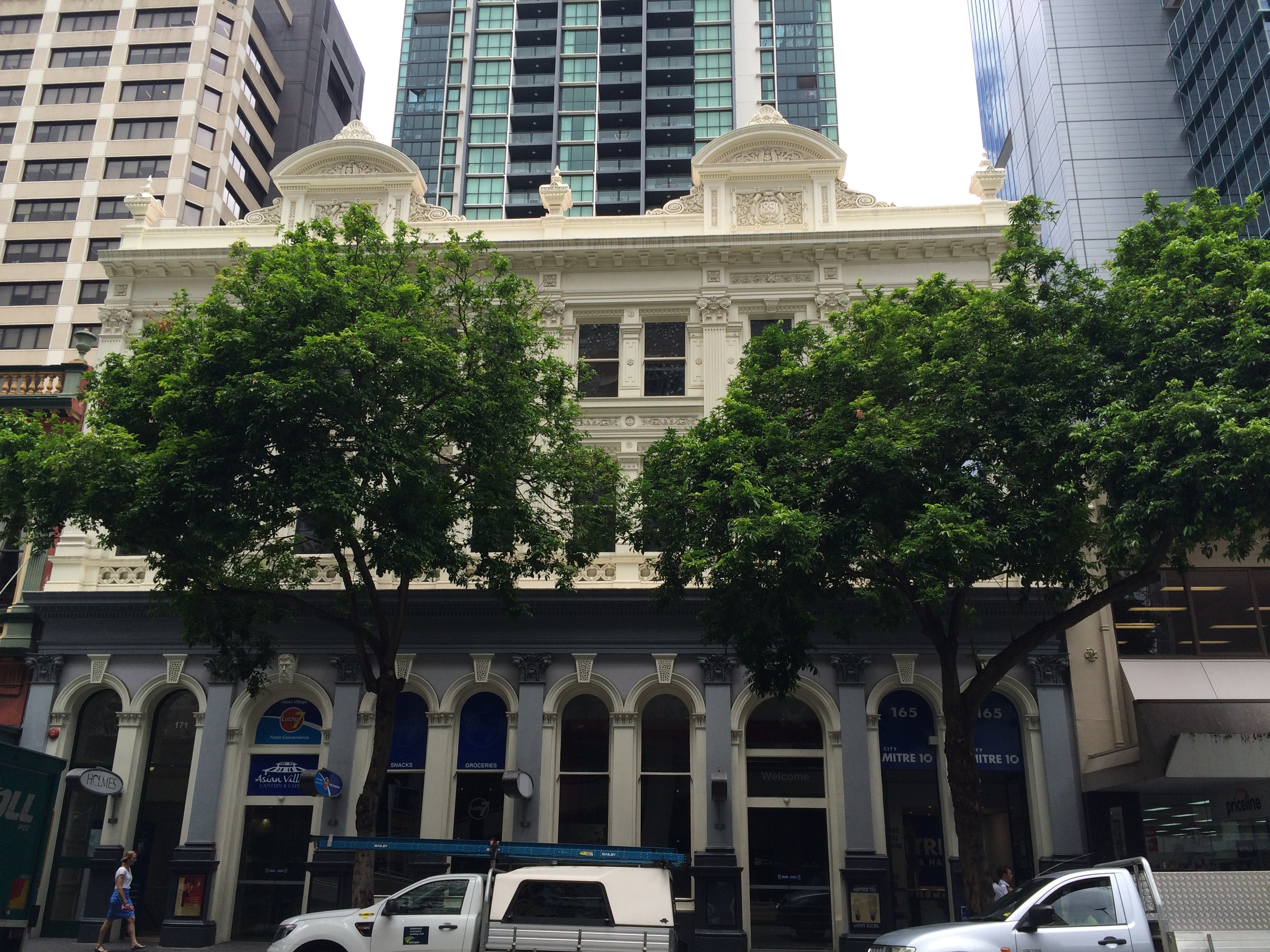
Different architectural styles on the ground and upper levels, 2015

Only the lower portion of the building's three level rendered brick facade can be attributed to the architect Andrea Stombuco. The upper two levels, which replaced Stombuco's single upper level, abandoned the arched openings of the original for a plainer trabeated construction. This has provided the building with a certain visual strength as the arched portion provides an apparent base for the upper levels of the building.

The facade is treated as two identical sections corresponding to the building's original subdivisions. Each of these sections comprises three bays with the central one being narrower than the other two. Originally, on the lower level, the central bays had the broad arched doorway to each tenancy which were flanked by a pair of arched windows to each side, but the windows on the southern section of the facade have since been opened up to ground level. This early portion of the facade is ordered by unfluted Corinthian pilasters rising from a plinth at sill level to a plain string course.

The upper two floors are linked by fluted giant order composite pilasters. The bay system is maintained with large rectangular windows in the flanking bays. As with the arched openings below, each window has its own framing pilasters.

The parapet is a heavily decorated cornice which supports, over the central bay of each section, a highly ornate pediment, the northern one bearing the initials JWH, and the southern one carrying the date of the buildings reconstruction, 1891. Three square ornate urns mark the centre and ends of the building at parapet level. Decoration is rich but used in a discreet way and consists mainly of panels of foliage at points of emphasis.

The facade is intact with the exception of window openings to the southern half which have been extended below the plinth at ground level, and re-glazed as large fixed panels to the upper levels. Internally, exposed trusses appear at the top level of the left hand bay. This side of the building also retains its timber post structure. The interior of the right hand bay has been covered by modern office partitioning and ceilings.

== Heritage listing ==
Heckelmanns Building was listed on the Queensland Heritage Register on 21 October 1992 having satisfied the following criteria.

The place is important in demonstrating the evolution or pattern of Queensland's history.

Heckelmanns Building is significant as a surviving element of the economic boom of the 1880s and the development of an Elizabeth Street commercial precinct. It is significant as part of an important streetscape including nearby Tara House.

The place is important in demonstrating the principal characteristics of a particular class of cultural places.

Heckelmanns Building is characteristic of a Victorian era retail warehouse with its elaborate and ornate facade treatment.

Heckelmanns Building is significant for the sympathetic rebuilding of the upper levels in relation to the original ground floor.

The place has a special association with the life or work of a particular person, group or organisation of importance in Queensland's history.

This building is important for its association with owner Joseph Wendelin Heckelmann, successful businessman and local councillor; with notable Brisbane merchandising firm Benjamin Bros; and with long-term tenant J Leutenegger.
