= St Patrick's Church, Fortitude Valley =

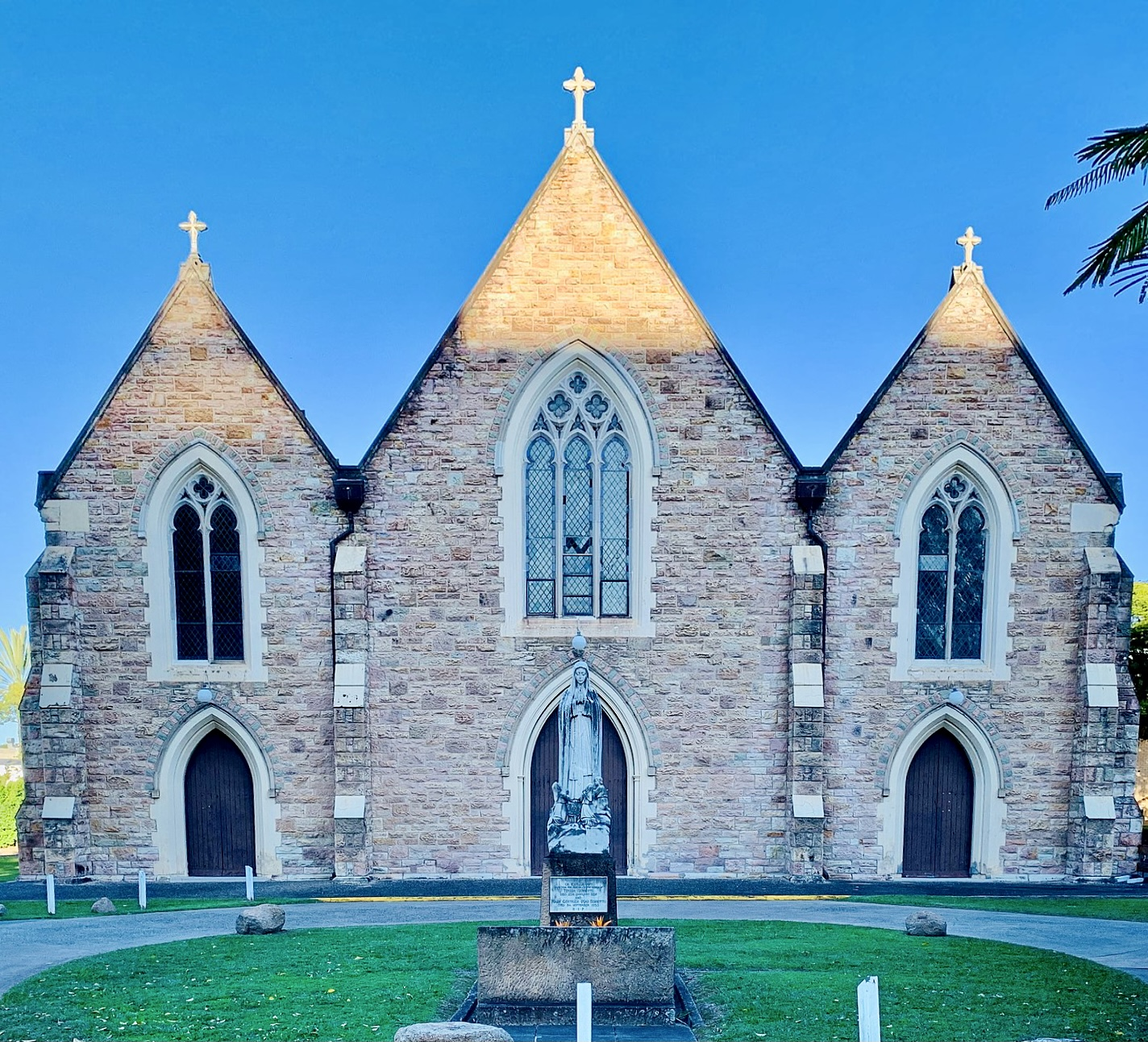
- St Patrick's Church, 2019
- St Patrick's Church, Fortitude Valley
- 27°27′28″S 153°02′18″E
- Address: 58 Morgan Street, Fortitude Valley, City of Brisbane, Queensland
- Country: Australia
- Denomination: Roman Catholic
- Website: cathedralofststephen.org.au/st-patricks-church.html

History
- Status: Church
- Founded: September 1880
- Founder: Bishop James O'Quinn
- Dedication: Saint Patrick
- Consecrated: 3 December 1882 by Archbishop Robert Dunne

Architecture
- Functional status: Active
- Architect: Andrea Giovanni Stombuco
- Architectural type: Church
- Style: Gothic Revival
- Years built: 1880–1882
- Construction cost: £6,000

Specifications
- Materials: Porphyry, dressed with sandstone

Administration
- Archdiocese: Brisbane
- Parish: St Stephen's Cathedral Parish

Queensland Heritage Register
- Official name: St Patrick's Church
- Type: State heritage (built)
- Designated: 21 October 1992
- Reference no.: 600210
- Significant period: 1880–1882 (fabric)
- Significant components: Stained glass window/s, trees/plantings, memorial – statue, furniture/fittings, pipe organ
- Builders: John Arthur Manis O'Keefe

St Patrick's Church is a heritage-listed Roman Catholic church at 58 Morgan Street, Fortitude Valley, City of Brisbane, Queensland, Australia. It was designed by Andrea Giovanni Stombuco and built from 1880 to 1882 by John Arthur Manis O'Keefe. It was added to the Queensland Heritage Register on 21 October 1992.

== History ==
=== Early Catholicism in Brisbane ===
This stone Gothic-styled church was erected in 1880–1882, to accommodate the growing Catholic population in Fortitude Valley. It replaced an earlier St Patrick's, erected in Wickham Street, opposite Duncan Street, in 1861, one block from the residence of the first Roman Catholic Bishop of Brisbane, James O'Quinn.

In the 1860s, Irish Catholics, brought to Queensland through the efforts of O'Quinn's Queensland Immigration Society, congregated in Fortitude Valley and adjacent suburbs. St Patrick's parish extended from Spring Hill, through Fortitude Valley to Newstead, Teneriffe and New Farm. By the late 1870s, the parish had outgrown the Wickham Street church.

=== Design and construction of the church ===
The new St Patrick's Church was one of the last of the substantial masonry ecclesiastical structures erected under Bishop O'Quinn's patronage, and was the largest church built during his occupancy of the Queensland Bishopric, 1861 to 1881, being at the time of greater seating capacity than St Stephen's Cathedral. O'Quinn transposed to Queensland, Ireland's Bishop Cullen's philosophy that new churches and ecclesiastical institutions should be expensive and Gothic, symbolising the new age of Irish Roman Catholicism. His successor, Robert Dunne (Bishop and later Archbishop of Brisbane 1882–1917), opposed such ostentatious displays, which had nearly bankrupted the Brisbane diocese.

The Morgan Street site, occupied by Magill's Paragon Nursery in the 1870s, was acquired by church trustees, including Bishop O'Quinn, c. 1880. In September that year, between 4,000 and 5,000 people gathered to watch the Bishop lay the foundation stone for the new church. Designed by architect and sculptor Andrea Giovanni Stombuco, the former Goulburn Diocesan Architect who reputedly was invited to Brisbane by Bishop O'Quinn, the church was to accommodate 1500 people. Tenders were called in October 1880, and the contract was let to Brisbane builder John Arthur Manis O'Keefe. Constructed of local porphyry and dressed with Murphys Creek sandstone, St Patrick's was completed in 1882 at an estimated cost of £6,000. The tower, which was part of the original design, was not built. The church was consecrated on 3 December 1882, by Archbishop Dunne.

Fittings included an organ constructed by local Brisbane musical instrument dealer and piano and organ builder, Thomas Christmas, at a cost of £360. Christmas, who had arrived in Brisbane from Melbourne in 1877, was credited with having constructed most of the locally made organs in Queensland by 1888.

In 1886 a belfry and bell were erected in the grounds, on the highest point on the site. The bell of patent cast steel, manufactured by Vicker, Son & Co. Ltd of Sheffield, England, was a gift from Fortitude Valley parishioner Thomas Reedy. In 1886–1887 ornamental additions were made to the church. The high altar of New Zealand Oamaru stone, designed and reputedly sculpted by Stombuco, was completed. Also installed were a timber pulpit; side altars of Oamaru stone, sculpted by John Petrie & Son of Brisbane; and, in the eastern wall, a large stained glass window imported from Lyon in France.

St Patrick's remained a large and important Irish Catholic parish until after the Second World War, despite the establishment of a separate New Farm parish c. 1928. From the 1950s, however, Fortitude Valley declined as a residential area, and from this is dated the gradual withering away of a local congregation.

=== Subsequent developments ===
At some period after the Second World War, possibly in the 1950s, the side altars and altar rails were replaced in marble, and marble flooring was laid in the chancel. By this time, the demographic composition of Fortitude Valley was changing, with substantial numbers of European migrants (principally Italian) congregating in Fortitude Valley/New Farm. Following the Vatican II resolutions of 1962, a new altar and sanctuary dais were installed in the middle of the church. A timber screen and doors just inside the main entrance have been removed. The 1886 belfry is no longer extant, but the original bell survives, housed in a steel structure.

In 1955, buildings formerly associated with St Patrick's School (located previously in Wickham Street and then in Ivory Street), were erected in the church grounds, and in 1969, a presbytery. These buildings do not form part of the present entry in the Heritage Register.

The parish of St Patrick's was dissolved c. 1990, and the church is administered from St Stephen's Cathedral. It attracts a large Sunday Mass congregation from the wider Brisbane Catholic community, and is popular for weddings and baptisms.

== Description ==
St Patrick's Church is a substantial Gothic-influenced stone building centrally sited on an interior block accessed via Berwick and Morgan Streets. Only the north-eastern facade of the church is visible from the end of Morgan Street.

The church has a monumental presence, with a simple rectangular form constructed in rough-axed porphyry. Its broad nave and aisles are expressed as three parapeted gables to the north-eastern principal elevation, following the line of three steeply pitched corrugated iron roofs. To the south-west, the nave extends past the aisles, forming a projecting chancel with a vestry attached in the south-western corner. The building has buttressed walls, and generous pointed arched windows and doors.

The coursed rubble stonework is dressed with sandstone to the hood mouldings, cornice, crosses and window tracery. The window reveals are in rendered brickwork and are surmounted with alternating green and pink stone voussoirs.

The church interior is impressive; the nave is separated from the aisles by octagonal columns supporting pointed arches. The nave is spanned by timber braced trusses with a king post and quatrefoil motifs to the haunches (the part of the arch between the top of the arch and the supporting pier); an ornamental timber fretwork truss/arch is centred over the chancel. Simpler scissor trusses run the length of the aisles. The diagonally boarded timber ceiling with exposed rafters is finished with a timber frieze with quatrefoil motifs. The side walls have diamond-glazed coloured-glass edged tracery windows, with smaller half-lights over the doors. Above the altar is a large stained glass window depicting the Resurrection of Jesus. The pointed arched doors are timber-framed and boarded. The chancel contains a richly carved Gothic-inspired Oamaru stone altar which sits on a stepped marble base bounded by a marble balustrade with brass gates. Less elaborate marble altars are located at the ends of the aisles. A stepped timber choir and organ loft is located at the other end of the church; it is supported by two colonnettes (thin columns), and is accessed by stone spiral stairs enclosed by a rendered brick wall. The loft balustrade is carved with quatrefoils, and has a continuous fretwork music stand at handrail level. The organ has richly carved timber surrounds. A timber-panelled reconciliation room is located to the north-eastern corner. The church also contains some fine furnishings including cedar pews decorated with gothic motifs and fretwork, a marble baptismal font, and an ornamental holy water stand.

The grounds include a steel bell suspended from an approximately four-metre-high (13 ft) steel frame in the southern corner, a stone memorial in the centre of a circular drive to the north east, and several mature fig trees. The site also contains newer school buildings which link to the church via a walkway abutting the western vestry entrance.

St Patrick's is a fine intact stone church, containing well-crafted stained glass windows and carved elements in timber, Oamaru stone and marble.

== Heritage listing ==
St Patrick's Church was listed on the Queensland Heritage Register on 21 October 1992 having satisfied the following criteria.

The place is important in demonstrating the evolution or pattern of Queensland's history.

St Patrick's Church is important in demonstrating the pattern of Queensland's history, being evidence of the consolidation of the Catholic church in Queensland in the last quarter of the 19th century. It is one of a group of substantial churches built in Fortitude Valley in the 1870s and 1880s, reflecting the residential growth of the Valley and adjacent suburbs in the last quarter of the 19th century.

The place is important in demonstrating the principal characteristics of a particular class of cultural places.

St Patrick's Church is important in demonstrating the principal characteristics of a late 19th century, Gothic-style stone church in Brisbane.

The place is important because of its aesthetic significance.

The building is important in demonstrating aesthetic characteristics which are valued by the community, namely the monumental and finely detailed quality of the exterior, the impressive spatial quality of its generous and finely detailed interior. Also of significance is the rich aesthetic quality of its crafted elements, in particular, the stained glass windows, the timber carvings to the organ loft balustrade, music stand, and to the pipe organ, the Oamaru stone altar, the marble altars and altar enclosure, and church furniture including the cedar pews, baptismal font and holy water stand.

The place has a strong or special association with a particular community or cultural group for social, cultural or spiritual reasons.

St Patrick's Church is significant as the focus of Catholic worship in Fortitude Valley for over a century, the building has a strong association with the local Catholic community, and in particular with the Irish Catholic community.

The place has a special association with the life or work of a particular person, group or organisation of importance in Queensland's history.

The building has a special association with the work of the Catholic Church in Brisbane and the ecclesiastical work of architect and sculptor Andrea Stombuco.
