= Mountview House =

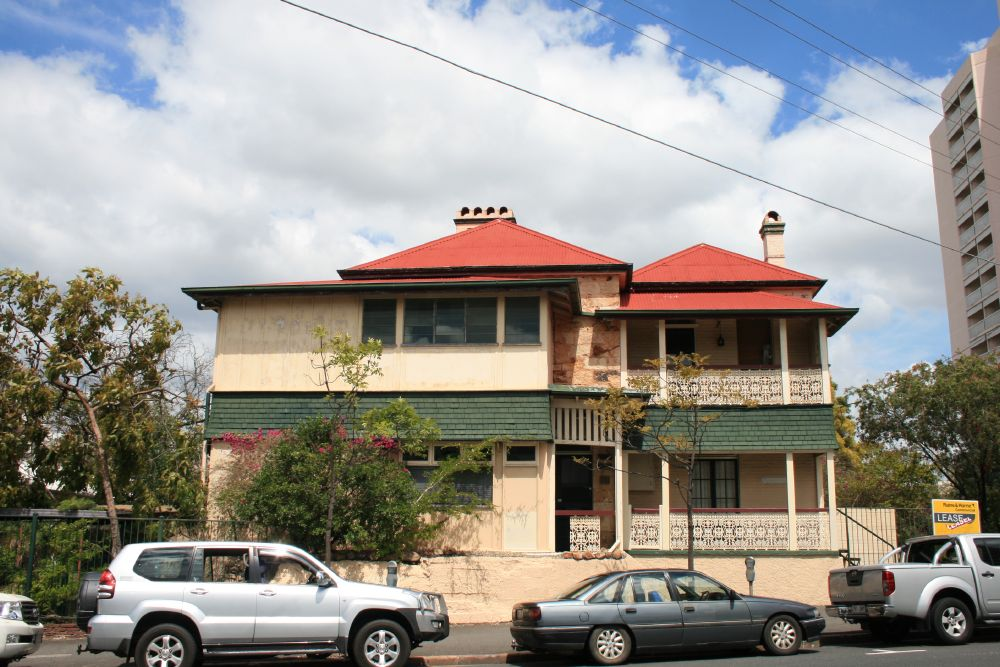
- Mountview House

- Location within Queensland Location within Australia
- 27.4622°S 153.0224°E
- Location: 37 Leichhardt Street, Spring Hill, City of Brisbane, Queensland, Australia

History
- Design period: 1840s–1860s (mid-19th century)
- Built: 1860s–1882
- Built for: Daniel McNaught

Site notes
- Architect: Andrea Stombuco

Queensland Heritage Register
- Official name: Mountview House
- Type: state heritage (built)
- Designated: 13 May 2004
- Reference no.: 602317
- Significant period: 1860s (historical, fabric); 1882 (historical, fabric)
- Significant components: garden/grounds, steps/stairway, residential accommodation – main house

Mountview House is a heritage-listed detached house at 37 Leichhardt Street, Spring Hill, City of Brisbane, Queensland, Australia. It was originally built in the 1860s with a new wing added in 1882 designed by Andrea Stombuco. It was added to the Queensland Heritage Register on 13 May 2004.

== History ==
The earliest section of Mountview House, a two-storeyed stone residence, is believed to have been erected in the 1860s for Brisbane foreman carpenter Daniel McNaught. A two-storeyed brick wing designed by architect Andrea Stombuco was added in 1882, when the house was converted into a preparatory school for boys. This part of Spring Hill was surveyed officially into suburban allotments in 1856, but was soon subdivided for closer residential settlement by speculative landowners. Along with Kangaroo Point and Petrie Terrace, Spring Hill was among the earliest of Brisbane's dormitory suburbs, attracting wealthier residents to the high land along the ridges, and the less affluent to the hollows in between: Hanly's Hollow (between Wickham Terrace and Leichhardt Street), Spring Hollow (between Leichhardt Street and Gregory Terrace), and York's Hollow (to the north of Gregory Terrace – an area occupied by a number of brick-makers in the 1850s and 1860s, now Victoria Park).

The site on which Mountview House is located was part of a larger parcel of land (suburban portions 177 and 178, parish of North Brisbane - totalling just over 2 acres (0.81 ha)) with a frontage to Leichhardt Street, purchased from the Crown by Brisbane draper Richard Ash Kingsford in November 1856 at a sale of Villa Allotments at Hanley's Valley, Brisbane. In the early 1860s this property was surveyed into 18 residential allotments and a 40-foot (12 m) wide road, later known as Downing Street.

In January 1863, Daniel McNaught of Brisbane purchased from Kingsford subdivisions 1 & 2 of suburban portion 178 (37.3 perches (940 m^{2})), at the corner of Leichhardt and Downing streets, located on the highest ground in Spring Hill. By September that year, McNaught had taken out a £450 mortgage on this property, from fellow Spring Hill resident, Robert Bourne. It is possible this helped finance the construction of Mountview House.

Daniel McNaught, a Dumbarton and Glasgow-trained carpenter, and his wife Barbara Ure, were amongst the first wave of Scottish immigrants to Queensland, arriving at Moreton Bay via the immigrant ship Artemisia in late 1848. For three years in the early 1850s Daniel prospected on the New South Wales goldfields, but in 1855 returned to Brisbane where he worked for his brother-in-law, businessman and contractor John Petrie (his sister, Jane Keith McNaught, had married John Petrie in Queensland in 1850). From the early 1860s McNaught was manager of Petrie's joinery works, and as foreman carpenter supervised the finishing of many of Petrie's most significant construction projects, including Parliament House, the Supreme Court, the Brisbane Hospital and the Brisbane Gaol on Petrie Terrace. Like many of the early Scottish immigrants, Daniel McNaught was active in local politics in the 1850s, opposing the re-introduction of convict labour and working for the separation of Queensland from New South Wales. He was a prominent and long-term member of the Wharf Street Congregational Church, a director of the City and Suburban Building Society from its inception, and a Magistrate of the colony.

It is thought that John Petrie constructed and/or designed Mountview House for the McNaughts in the 1860s, possibly initially as an investment rather than as their home, as Daniel McNaught, carpenter, is recorded as resident in Creek Street in the 1868 and 1874 Post Office Directories. However, the McNaugths were resident at their Leichhardt Street property in 1876, the year in which Mrs McNaught died. By this year also a small timber cottage had been erected at the rear of Mountview House, fronting Downing Street [No.8], which was occupied by their son John Ure McNaught, a Queen Street bookseller and stationer. By 1878 Daniel McNaught had moved into the cottage, and Mountview House was occupied by Presbyterian minister Rev. JF McSwaine.

In 1880 Daniel McNaught took out two mortgages on his Spring Hill property, totalling £1850, and from 1 August 1881 Sarah Cargill held a five-year lease on Mountview House, which she ran as a boys' preparatory school. In January 1882, title to the property [which included both Mountview House and 8 Downing Street] was transferred from McNaught to Mrs Rebecca Thorn, who honoured the lease with Sarah Cargill. It is likely Mrs Thorn commissioned the 1882 additions to Mountview House, designed by Brisbane architect Andrea Stombuco, for Sarah Cargill's Boys' Preparatory School.

By 1883, Daniel McNaught had left Downing Street, and at his death in 1891, aged 67 years, was resident at Edgar Cottage in Amelia Street, Fortitude Valley.

In 1890 Rebecca Thorn sold off 16 perches (400 m^{2}) at the rear of Mountview House, containing No.8 Downing Street, retaining Mountview House on 20.7 perches (520 m^{2}). By this year, Mrs Mary Glandford was utilising Mountview House as a boarding-house, and the building continued in this function for several decades.

Following Rebecca Thorn's death in 1916, Mountview House was transferred by her devisees to Joseph O'Donnell of Brisbane, who established a motor garage at the corner of Leichhardt and Downing streets (33 Leichhardt Street), and occupied Mountview House as his private residence. He may also have continued to operate the place as a boarding house.

In 1937 O'Donnell sold the property to James Walter Cloughley and Miss Annie Ellen Cloughley, both of whom in 1938 also acquired title to 8 Downing Street – the 16 perches (400 m^{2}) subdivision from the Mountview House grounds sold by Mrs Thorn in 1890. Under the Cloughleys, Mountview House functioned as a tenement building. In 1954 they sold 8 Downing Street and in late 1955 transferred Mountview House to the principal partners in the Brisbane architectural firm of Ford Hutton and Newell – Peter Edward Newell, Theodore Bernhard Hutton, Neville Henry Lund and Bruce Donald Paulsen – who refurbished the building as offices. Since the 1970s the building has served as both residence and professional offices.

== Description ==
Located on a prominent ridge in Spring Hill, one of Brisbane's oldest residential suburbs, Mountview house is a two-storeyed stone and brick building with two-storeyed verandahs on three sides. Situated on a corner, facing Leichhardt Street to the north with Downing Street to the west, it is built up to the Leichhardt Street alignment. Side gardens separate the house from Downing Street and the eastern neighbour.

The house is raised half a level above Leichhardt Street on a masonry base. It consists of two major parts, the original rectangular planned stone core on the east, abutting a brick extension on the west. A smaller brick wing and other more recent extensions are located on the south side of the building. Due to the angle at which the building faces the Leichardt Street alignment, the front facade steps back at the junction between the stone and brick sections. The stone used appears to be local porphyry, squared and laid in rough courses. The brickwork has been painted.

The stone core and western brick extension have separately framed hip roofs clad in painted corrugated iron. A box gutter runs between the two main roofs. A rendered masonry chimney emerges from both roofs. The chimney on the stone core is larger, having multiple flues.

The verandahs on the front facade are not continuous due to the stepping back of the western brick wing. The verandah, which wraps around the northern, eastern and southern sides of the stone core, is enclosed with cement sheeting and louvres. An open verandah on the front of the western brick wing is set back from the enclosed verandah, running into the sidewall of the stone core. It has cast iron balustrades, timber posts and a shingle valence between the upper and lower levels. The shingle valence can also be seen built into the enclosed verandah. The verandahs have skill ion roofs that are hipped at the corners and ends. The overhangs on the verandah roofs are wider than those on the main part of the house.

Located in the space created by the setback of the brick wing, the front entry stairs are built into the masonry base. The stairs terminate in a small entry porch, a timber framed, flat roofed structure with a timber-battened valence that is attached to the western end of the enclosed verandah. A door opens off the entry porch directly into the stone core of the building. A steel framed stair links the lower level of the open front verandah with the side garden.

The brick wall on the western side of the building, the only side without a verandah, has five double hung timber framed windows with six paned sashes. A single storey extension with a brick parapet wall and shallow pitched roof has been built on the southwestern corner of the building. This relatively recent extension abuts an older southern brick wing with a low-pitched hipped roof and projecting corbelled brick bay. An open timber staircase connects the eastern garden with the upper level of the southern verandah.

From the entry porch, the front door opens into a wide hallway. The hallway, located in the stone section of the building, contains a staircase that leads to the upper level. In addition to the hallway space, the stone core has two rooms on each level, all containing fireplaces with timber mantelpieces and opening onto the enclosed verandahs. Openings in the thick masonry walls have deep timber reveals and timber architraves. Some timber paneled doors remain but French doors from the openings onto the enclosed verandahs have been removed. The enclosed verandahs have been partly lined with cement sheeting and the stonework walls facing onto the enclosed verandahs have been painted.

Access to the western brick extension is directly from the entrance hall. This section of the house consists of a single large room on each level. A fireplace, flanked by double hung windows, is positioned in the centre of the western wall on the lower level. On both levels, a door in the north wall leads to the open north verandahs. Bathroom and laundry facilities have been built into the upper level of the southern verandah.

Windows throughout the older part of the building are generally timber framed double hung sashes. Internal walls and ceilings are plastered and painted and floors are generally timber.

The brick wing at the rear of Mountview house is accessed from the lower level of the southern verandah. It consists of a single room and contains remnants of a former fireplace. The other additions to the rear of Mountview House include a large kitchen area and storeroom and are of relatively recent construction.

== Heritage listing ==
Mountview House was listed on the Queensland Heritage Register on 13 May 2004 having satisfied the following criteria.

The place is important in demonstrating the evolution or pattern of Queensland's history.

Mountview House, a c. 1860s two-storeyed stone residence with 1882 additions, is important in illustrating the evolution of Queensland's history, in particular the pattern of residential settlement in the capital city, Brisbane, in the mid-19th century. It is also important historically for its association with the first wave of Scottish immigrants to Queensland, including the McNaught and Petrie families, and their contribution to the expansion of the colony.

The place demonstrates rare, uncommon or endangered aspects of Queensland's cultural heritage.

The place has rarity value as one of comparatively few c. 1860s stone buildings to survive in Queensland and is important in illustrating features of an 1860s residence, including two-storeyed construction in stone, verandahs, fireplaces, a chimney and a hipped roof.

The place is important in demonstrating the principal characteristics of a particular class of cultural places.

The place has rarity value as one of comparatively few c. 1860s stone buildings to survive in Queensland and is important in illustrating features of an 1860s residence, including two-storeyed construction in stone, verandahs, fireplaces, a chimney and a hipped roof.

The place is important because of its aesthetic significance.

Located high on one of the principal ridges through Spring Hill, the place has landmark value and maintains an important contribution to the streetscape of Leichhardt Street. Additions to the original 1860s core, including the brick wing added by Andrea Stombuco and the entry porch, have been well designed and enhance the aesthetic appeal of Mountview house.
