= Andrea Stombuco =

Italian-Australian sculptor (1820–1907)

Andrea Giovanni Stombuco (1820–1907) was an Italian-born Australian sculptor and architect. Many of the buildings he designed are listed on the heritage registers in Australia.

== Early life ==
Andrea Stombuco travelled widely and was involved in various business enterprises, including stone quarrying at Cape Town in the Cape Colony.

== Career ==
=== Victoria ===
Andrea Stombuco emigrated to Victoria in 1851. After trying his luck on the goldfields, he established himself in Victoria as a sculptor, monumental mason, builder and architect, and found a patron in the Roman Catholic Church. He was the contractor for a number of Catholic churches in Victoria and for most of the stonework of Ballarat Cathedral.

=== Career in New South Wales ===
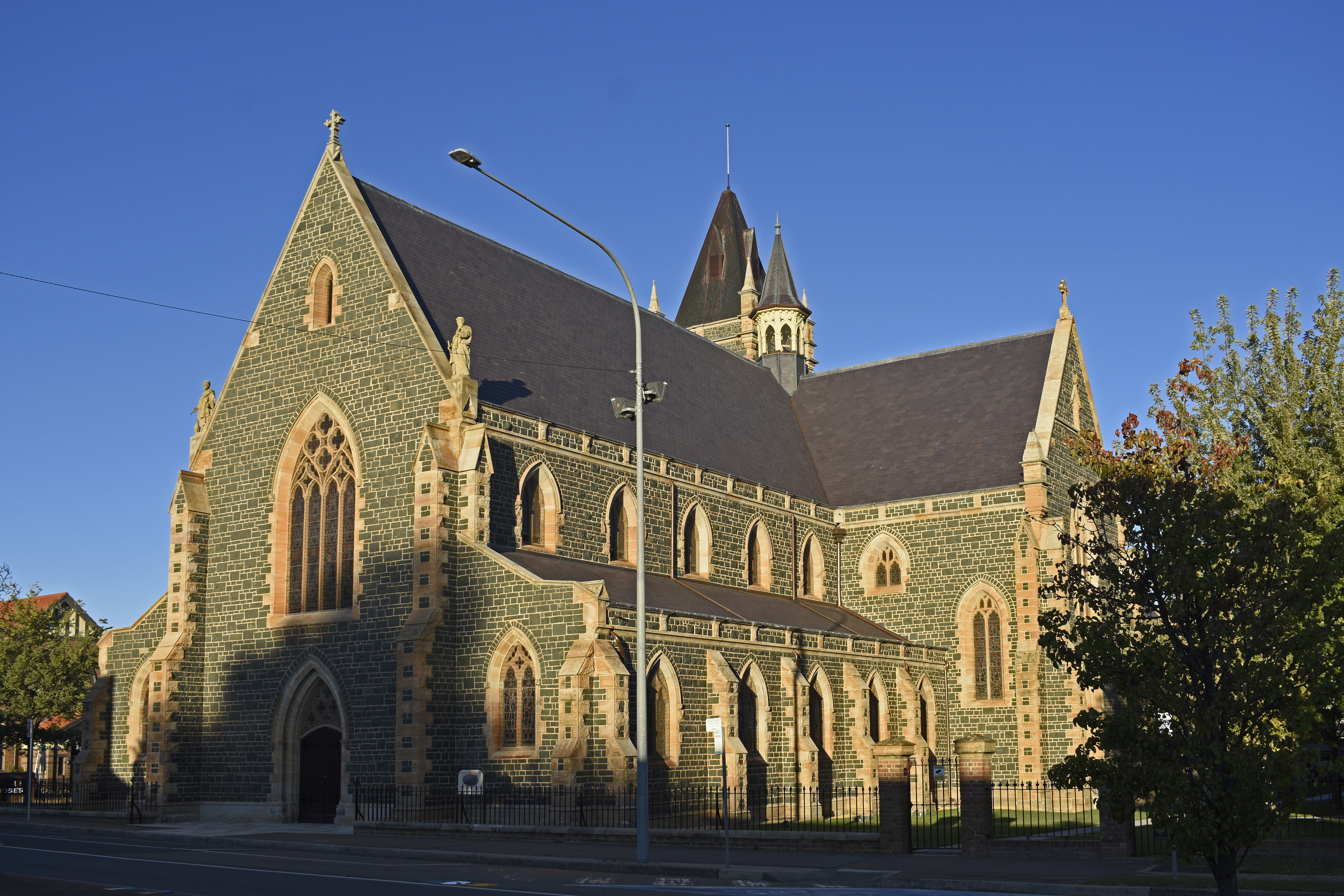
St Peter and Paul's Old Cathedral, Goulburn

In 1869 Stambuco was appointed Architect for the Roman Catholic Diocese of Goulburn in New South Wales. In 1874, the foundation stone of St Matthias' Anglican Church, Currawang, was laid by The Venerable Archdeacon Puddicombe of Goulburn. The design was by Stombuco. Stombuco at the time conducted a practice in Verner Street of that city.

=== Queensland ===
Stombuco moved to Queensland in 1875 on the advice of Rev. Patrick Dunne of Goulburn, and may have been appointed Catholic Diocesan Architect, receiving a number of important architectural commissions from the Roman Catholic Bishop of Brisbane, James O'Quinn. These included St Joseph's College, Gregory Terrace at Brisbane (1875–76), St Mary's Presbytery at Ipswich (1876), St Francis Xavier Church, Goodna (1880–81), part of All Hallows at Petrie Bight (1880–82) and St Patricks Church, Fortitude Valley (1880–82). With his eldest son, Giovanni Stombuco, whom he took into partnership in 1886, he also designed St Joseph's College, Nudgee, erected 1889–90. Among his more prominent non-Catholic works were St Andrews Anglican Church, South Brisbane (1878–83) and Her Majesty's Theatre, Brisbane (1885–88).

Stombuco designed a number of large houses in Brisbane, including Friedenthal (1886–87) at Eagle Farm for WH Heckelman; and Rhyndarra (1889) at Yeronga for W Williams. He also designed several speculative ventures for himself, including Bertholme at New Farm (now the Moreton Club).

== Sans Souci ==
Sans Souci (meaning 'without care', now known as Palma Rosa) is a three-level sandstone house built in 1886–87, possibly as a speculative venture for, and to the design of Andrea Stombuco. It is one of Stombuco's most flamboyant residential designs, erected at the pinnacle of his success in Queensland. Ironically, construction of the building may also have been a strong contributory cause to his near insolvency in the late 1880s/early 1890s.

Stombuco had obtained title to the Sans Souci site in 1886. At that time it comprised 3 roods 19.2 perches, and was part of the Toorak Estate subdivision. The house was designed in 1886, the year Giovanni Stombuco entered into partnership with his father, but it is not known to what extent he contributed to the design. The house was constructed in 1886–87 by Brisbane contractors JAM O'Keeffe (who possibly had the overall supervision), A Petrie (who supplied the stone) and J Watson (presumably of the plumbing firm Watson Brothers), and builders Bell & McLaughlan.

On completion in late 1887, Sans Souci was described in the local press as undoubtedly one of the finest residences in or about Brisbane. The building was of three storeys, and constructed of stone from Petrie's Quarry (probably the nearby Petrie's Quarry, on the northern side of Crosby Road). The rooms were all generously proportioned, with elaborate French-polished joinery and highly decorative cornices and ceiling roses in the principal rooms. The main hallway was decorated with an arch supported by fluted columns with corinthian capitals, and had tessellated Minton tiles on the floor. Sicilian marble was used for the steps at the front door and at the porch entrance, and for most of the mantelpieces, which also had Minton tiles in the hearths.

Whether Sans Souci was built as a speculative venture, or whether it was intended as the Stombuco family home, is not clear. If the Stombucos occupied the house, it was very briefly. The house was completed by mid-December 1887, when Stombuco hosted an entertainment at Sans Souci to mark the completion of the building, but from 1888 to 1891, the Queensland Post Office Directories list Stombuco's private residence as Lechmere Street, New Farm.

In September 1888, Stombuco took out a mortgage of £4,500 on Sans Souci from the Queensland Investment and Land Mortgage Company, of which Sir Arthur Hunter Palmer, Premier of Queensland from May 1870 to January 1874, was a director and principal shareholder.

When Queensland's boom economy crashed in 1890, Stombuco was forced to auction his then residence, Briar House - a more modest residence in Lechmere Street, New Farm, which he had erected in 1888. Some time before 1891, it appears that the mortgage company controlled Sans Souci, although Stombuco technically retained title until 1913.

== Later life ==
Following his financial collapse, Andrea Stombuco left Queensland for Perth, Western Australia in 1891. His wife and son remained in Queensland, but Stombuco never returned, and died in Perth in 1907. Giovanni Stombuco retired from architecture when his father left Queensland in 1891, moving with his mother to Spring Vale Farm at Kuraby.

== Works ==
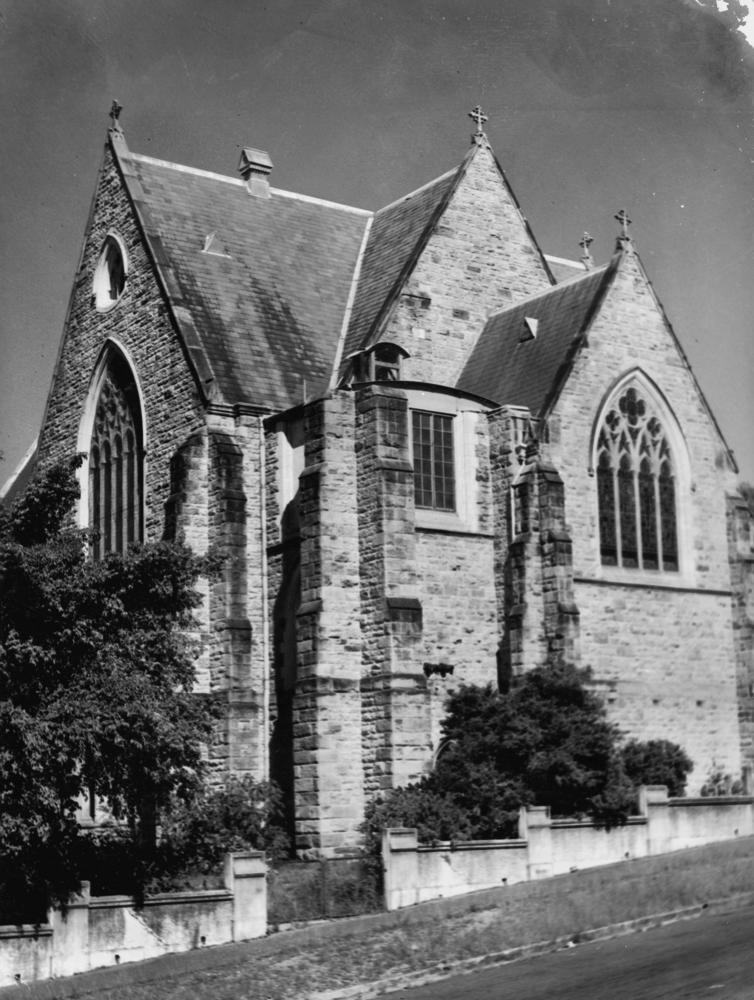
St. Andrew's Church of England, South Brisbane, 1947

His works include:

=== Queensland ===
==== Brisbane ====
- One small section of the Allan and Stark Building, a heritage-listed shopping centre in Queen Street, Brisbane
- the Main Building of All Hallows' School, a heritage-listed convent and school in Fortitude Valley, Brisbane
- Bertholme, a heritage-listed residence in New Farm, Brisbane
- Heckelmanns Building, a heritage-listed retail and warehouse building in Elizabeth Street, Brisbane
- Mountview House, a heritage-listed residence in Spring Hill, Brisbane
- Palma Rosa, originally called Sans Souci, a heritage-listed residence in Hamilton, Brisbane
- Rhyndarra, a heritage-listed residence in Yeronga, Brisbane
- St Andrews Anglican Church, a heritage-listed church in South Brisbane
- the first portion of the Main Building at St Joseph's College, Nudgee, a heritage-listed school at Nudgee, Queensland, Brisbane
- St Patricks Church, a heritage-listed church in Fortitude Valley, Brisbane
- Theatre Royal, Brisbane's first theatre, built 1865, demolished 1987

==== Ipswich ====
- St Francis Xavier Church, a heritage-listed church in Goodna, Queensland
- The presbytery within St Marys Roman Catholic Church Precinct, a heritage-listed precinct in Ipswich, Queensland
