= St Mary's Church, Ipswich =

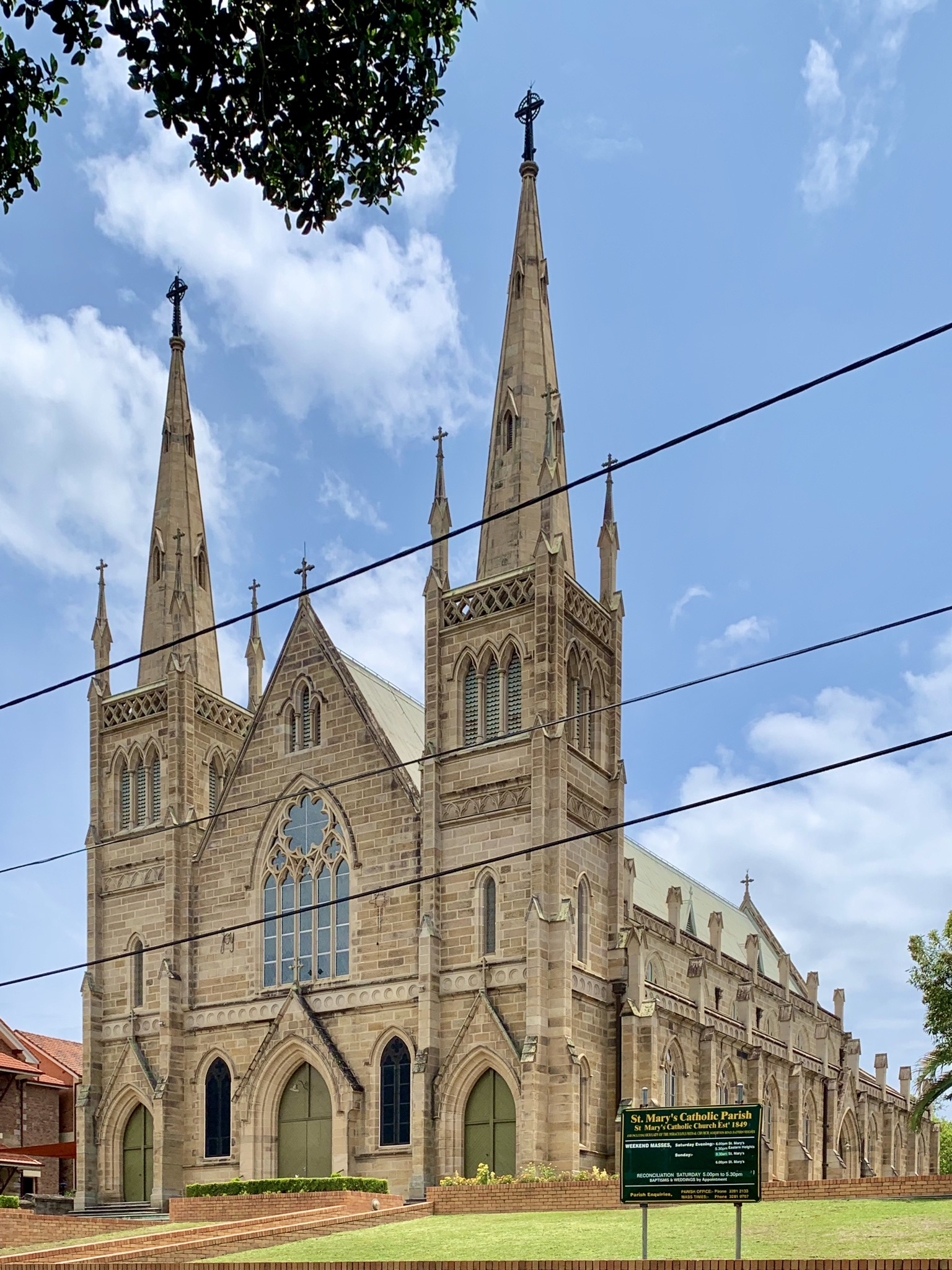
- St Mary's Church, pictured in 2020
- St Mary's Church, Ipswich
- 27.61°S 152.7561°E
- Address: Mary Street, Woodend, Ipswich, City of Ipswich, Queensland
- Country: Australia
- Denomination: Roman Catholic
- Website: ipswichcatholic.au

History
- Status: Church
- Founded: 25 October 1858
- Founder: Archbishop John Bede Polding
- Dedication: Mary, mother of Jesus
- Consecrated: 2 October 1904 by Cardinal James Freeman

Architecture
- Functional status: Active
- Architect(s): Andrea Stombuco (Presbytery); Francis Drummond Greville Stanley (Church)
- Architectural type: Church
- Style: Neo-Classical / Gothic Revival
- Years built: 1874–1970s

Specifications
- Materials: Stone

Administration
- Archdiocese: Brisbane
- Parish: Ipswich

Clergy
- Priest: Fr. Stephen Bliss OFM

Queensland Heritage Register
- Official name: St Marys Roman Catholic Church Precinct, Convent, formerly St Brigids Convent, St Marys Roman Catholic Church, Presbytery, Parish Hall and
- Type: State heritage (built)
- Designated: 21 October 1992
- Reference no.: 600577
- Significant period: 1874–1884, 1887–1889, 1900–1904, 1909, 1915, 1954, 1970s (fabric); 1850s–ongoing (historical)
- Significant components: Convent/nunnery, church, tower, trees/plantings, tomb, wall/s, garden – ornamental/flower, hall, school/school room, pipe organ, driveway, tower – bell / belfry, residential accommodation – presbytery, hitching post

St Mary's Church is a heritage-listed Roman Catholic church precinct at Mary Street, Woodend, Ipswich, City of Ipswich, Queensland, Australia. It was built from 1874 to 1970s. It is also known as the former St Brigids Convent. It was added to the Queensland Heritage Register on 21 October 1992.

== History ==
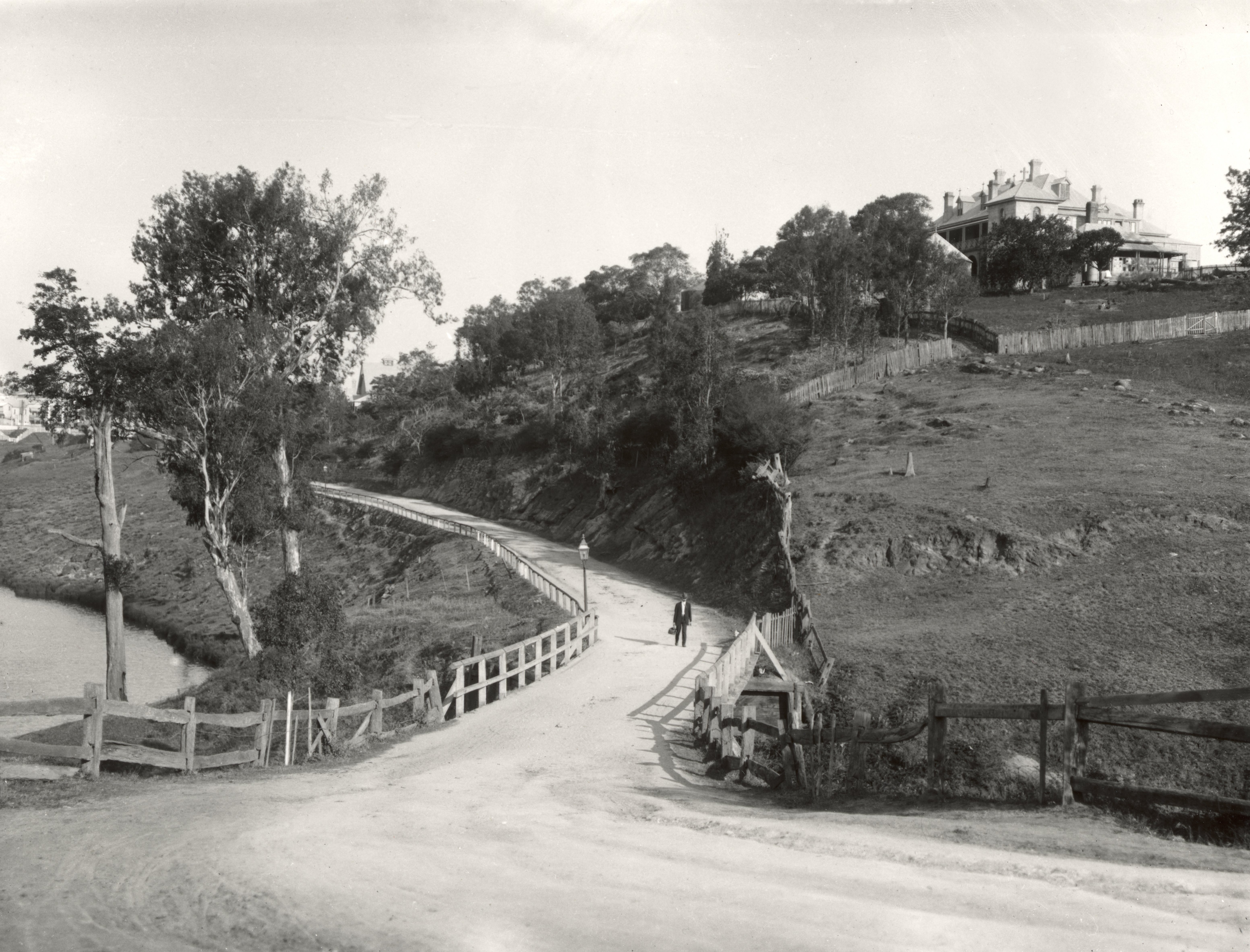
St Mary's church and convent are on the top of the hill to the right, the Bremer River is on the left, circa 1900

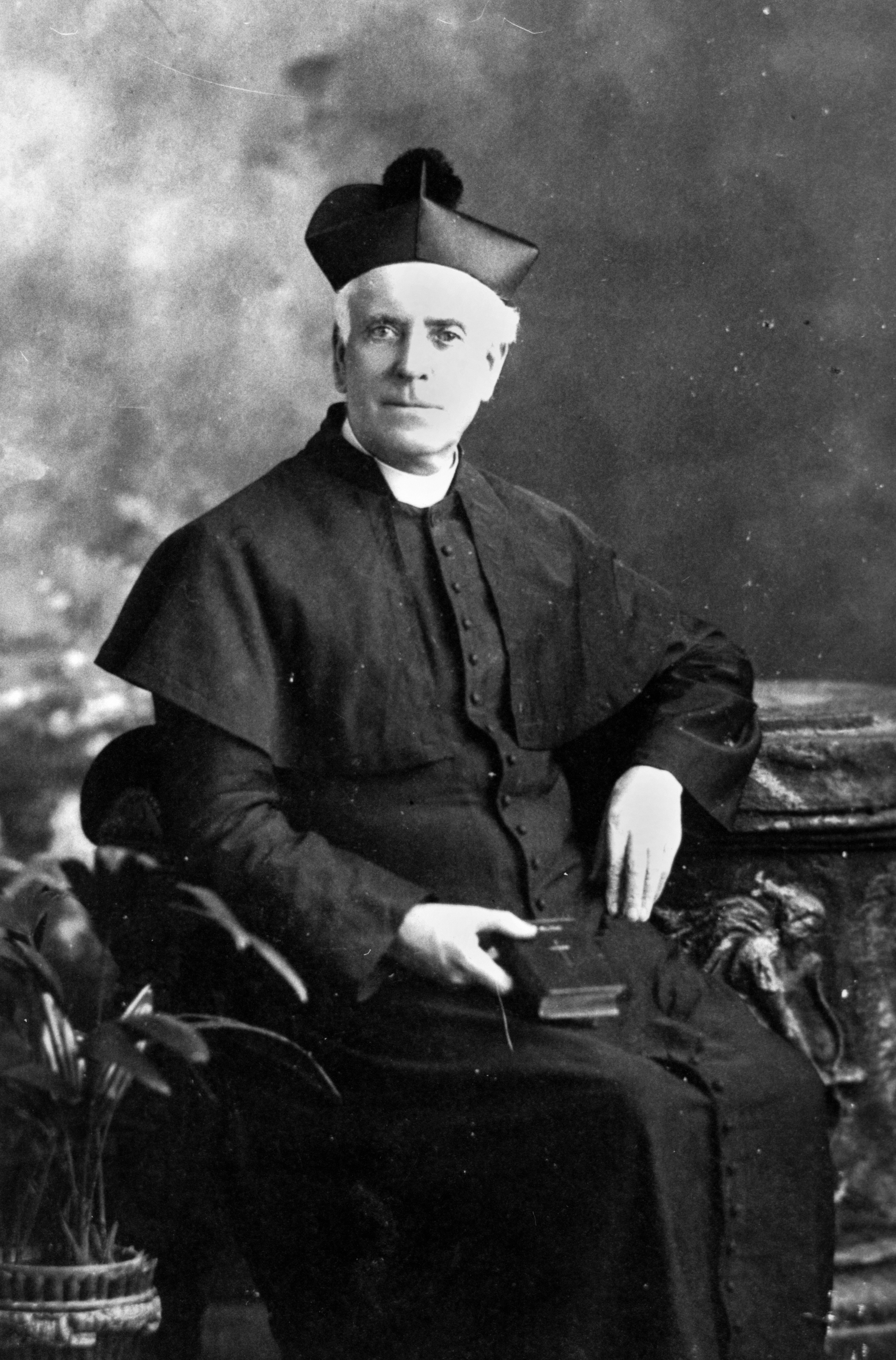
Father Andrew Horan

The first Catholic church in Ipswich was established about 1849 on the corner of Mary Street and Elizabeth Street. It was made of slab and shingles.

On 25 October 1858, Archbishop of Sydney John Bede Polding laid the foundation stone for a new stone church. The church was designed by William Holloway Chambers and built by John Petrie at a cost of £7000. The first mass was conducted on Sunday 4 December 1860 by Reverend W. McGinty. The consecration of the church had to await the arrival of the first Bishop of Brisbane, James Quinn and was performed by Cardinal James Freeman.

Near the end of the 1800s, it became apparent that the second St Mary's Church was inadequate for the growing population of Ipswich. Father Andrew Horan and the Catholic community agreed to construct a new larger church. The foundation stone was laid by Archbishop Dunne on 28 October 1900 and was constructed according to the plan of St Joseph's Cathedral, Rockhampton, designed by Francis Drummond Greville Stanley. While the new church was under construction, St Mary's Parish Hall was built to serve as a temporary place of worship. The new church was dedicated on Rosery Sunday, 2 October 1904 by Cardinal Francis Moran, third archbishop of Sydney and within seven years of the dedication day, the £40,000 cost of the church had been cleared.

The first presbytery, a timber cottage, was built in 1860, but by the 1870s was in extremely poor condition. The congregation of St Mary's and the parish priest at the time, Father Andrew Horan, agreed to build a more substantial building. The present presbytery, built in 1876, was designed by the Italian architect Andrea Stombuco who had moved to Brisbane in 1875. This structure is the oldest building in the St Mary's Precinct. The Neo-Classical style building was built of stone and plastered inside and out with Portland cement.

== Description ==
The current St Mary's Church is a substantial sandstone building constructed in a Gothic Revival style. The building's design is based on St Joseph's Cathedral in Rockhampton which was designed by FDG Stanley. The body of the building is rectangular in plan with a nave, aisles and twin spires at the front of the building. The rectangular annexe at the rear of the church is constructed from stone from the previous (1859) church building and is constructed in a more course sandstone.

St Mary's Presbytery is a two storeyed stone building constructed in the manner of an Italian villa, to the design of the architect Andrea Stombuco. It is rectangular in plan with a stair hall leading to four rooms at each level.

== Heritage listing ==
St Mary's Roman Catholic Church Precinct was listed on the Queensland Heritage Register on 21 October 1992 having satisfied the following criteria.

The place is important in demonstrating the evolution or pattern of Queensland's history.

This extensive precinct was established in the late 1850s as the central site of the Roman Catholic Church in Ipswich. Development of St Mary's Catholic Church Complex reflects the principal phases of development and growth in Ipswich, particularly during the nineteenth and early twentieth centuries.

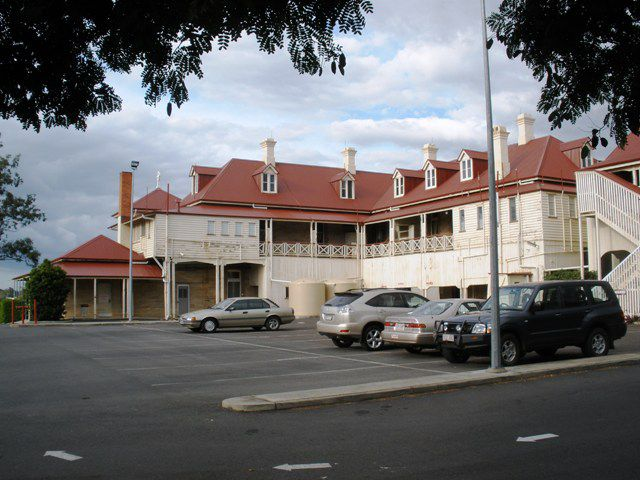
Convent, 2009

The place is important in demonstrating the principal characteristics of a particular class of cultural places.

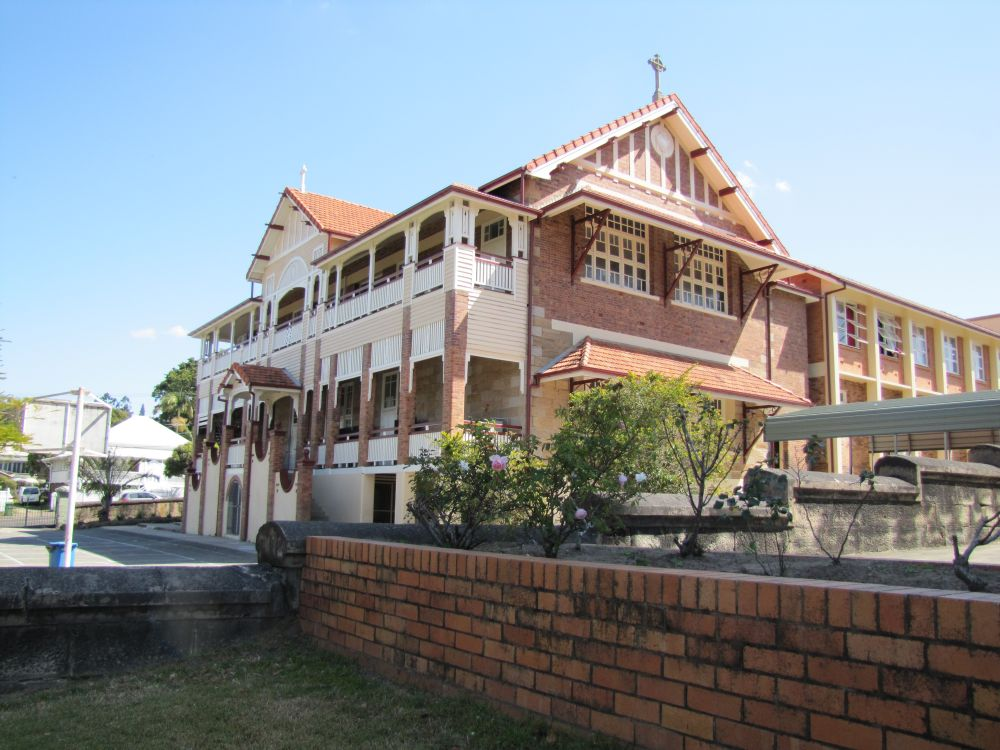
Boys' school, 2012

The complex is a good and substantially intact example of a nineteenth and early twentieth century Roman Catholic Complex with a prominent church, presbytery, parish hall, school buildings and convent. The prominence of the site and architectural quality of the buildings make this a particularly good example of an ecclesiastical precinct in Queensland.

The place is important because of its aesthetic significance.

St Mary's Complex is a landmark in Ipswich and has, for this reason, considerable aesthetic and social value. The site has a number of significant buildings and elements which, individually, have aesthetic and architectural value. St Mary's Church is a good and substantial example of early twentieth century Gothic Revival churches. The presbytery is a fine example of building designed in the Italian villa style, appropriate to the sub tropical climate of Brisbane. Further this building is important as a good example of the work of the renowned Catholic architect, Andrea Giovanni Stombuco. The school buildings, parish hall and convent are also fine buildings of considerable architectural merit.

The place has a strong or special association with a particular community or cultural group for social, cultural or spiritual reasons.

St Mary's Catholic Church is significant for its association with Father Andrew Horan, Parish Priest of St Mary's from 1872 to 1924. Father Horan supervised construction of the church and is buried and commemorated inside the church.

The place has a special association with the life or work of a particular person, group or organisation of importance in Queensland's history.

St Mary's Catholic Church is significant for its association with Father Andrew Horan, Parish Priest of St Mary's from 1872 to 1924. Father Horan supervised construction of the church and is buried and commemorated inside the church.
