= James Quinn (bishop) =

Irish-Australian prelate of the Catholic Church (1819–1881)

- Archbishop of Brisbane
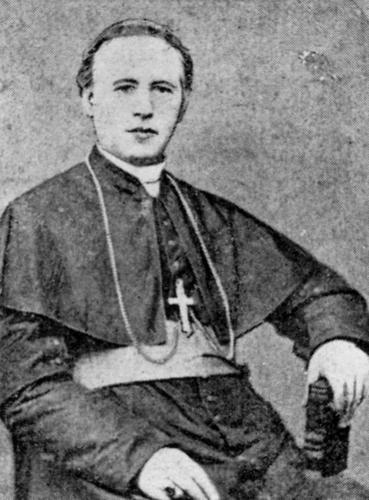
- Quinn c. 1860
- Church: Catholic Church
- Archdiocese: Brisbane
- See: Cathedral of St Stephen
- Appointed: 12 April 1859
- Installed: 29 June 1859
- Term ended: 18 August 1881
- Predecessor: Position established
- Successor: Robert Dunne

Orders
- Ordination: 15 August 1843 by Daniel Murray
- Consecration: 29 June 1859 by Joseph Dixon; James Alipius Goold (co-consecrator); John Francis Whelan (co-consecrator)

Personal details
- Born: James Quinn; 17 March 1819 Athy, County Kildare, Ireland
- Died: 18 August 1881 (aged 62) Fortitude Valley, Brisbane, Colony of Queensland
- Buried: Cathedral of St Stephen

James Quinn, also known as James Quinn (17 March 1819 – 18 August 1881), was an Irish-Australian prelate of the Catholic Church and the first bishop of the Diocese of Brisbane.

== Early life ==
Quinn was born at Rathbane (or Athy), County Kildare, Ireland, son of Matthew Quinn, a farmer, and his wife Mary née Doyle. Quinn had a classical and general education in Ireland before undertaking theological studies at the Irish College, Rome.

== Religious life ==
Quinn was ordained a priest in Rome on the Feast of the Assumption, 15 August 1843. His first assignment was in a church in Blackrock. In 1850 he founded and was president of St Laurence O'Toole's Seminary (his uncle, Fr John Doyle, had previously run the Connexional Seminary of St Laurence O'Toole on Ushers Quay) and Catholic Day School, at 16/17 Harcourt St., Dublin, which was popularly known as ‘Dr Quinn's school’, this St Lawrence Academy evolved into the Catholic University School in Dublin. His good work impressed his superiors, particularly Cardinal Paul Cullen. In June 1859 when the Diocese of Brisbane was created, Quinn was appointed the first bishop. He was consecrated in Dublin on 29 June 1859, but did not arrive in Queensland until 1861. Quinn was consecrated by Joseph Dixon, Archbishop of Armagh, with James Alipius Goold, Bishop (later Archbishop) of Melbourne, and John Francis Whelan, Vicar Apostolic Emeritus of Bombay and Titular Bishop of Aureliopolis in Lydia, as co-consecrators.

On arrival in Brisbane, the new diocese had four churches, four schools and a debt of £1250. Quinn was very active in trying to grow the Roman Catholic presence, leading to the joke that the colony should not be called Queensland but Quinn's Land. Despite such remarks, he was respected by both Catholics and Protestants alike. When a prominent Orangeman Rev Porteus gave a speech in Ipswich that angered the Irish Catholics, a riot was feared at a picnic to be held by the Orangemen the following day. Quinn travelled to Ipswich and used his influence with Catholics to calm them and then he attended the picnic to spread goodwill among the Protestants.

In 1875, the Irish celebrated the centenary of the birth of Irish nationalist Daniel O'Connell. As part of these celebrations, Quinn announced he was adding an "O" to his surname and would be henceforth known as O'Quinn.

He tried to obtain government support for Catholic schools and clashed with Mother Mary MacKillop. He organised a large-scale Queensland Immigration Scheme to relieve distress in Ireland and populate Queensland with Irish. The first of 13 ships arrived in 1862.

His brother, Matthew Quinn, became the Roman Catholic Bishop of Bathurst in New South Wales. Four sons of their sister Sarah (who married John Horan) also became priests: Matthew, Andrew, James and Joseph Horan.

== Later life ==
O'Quinn suffered ill health late in life. On 16 August 1881, he was pronounced gravely ill and last rites were administered. He died in his home Dara in Fortitude Valley on 18 August 1881 aged 62, having done a good deal to moderate the acerbity of Irish factional feeling during his episcopate.

At 4:00 pm on the day of his death, a procession formed at Dara to convey his body to the Cathedral of St Stephen. Although the intention had been for the coffin to be carried by a hearse, several men volunteered to carry it on their shoulders. The procession was led by the clergy, followed by the coffin and its pallbearers, the Sisters of Mercy, the children from Catholic schools, and then the public. O'Quinn's body was robed and lay in state in front of the high altar, where hundreds of people came to the church to pay their respects. The litany for the dead was conducted throughout the night.

At 8:00 am the following day, there was a Requiem Mass followed at 9:00 am by a Pontifical High Mass celebrated by his brother Matthew Quinn and assisted by his four Horan nephews. After the Mass, people continued to file past the coffin for many hours. Many people travelled from Ipswich and Toowoomba to pay their respects. A group of Warwick citizens chartered a train to enable them to attend. At approximately 5:00 pm, a funeral procession was formed and left the cathedral, proceeding along Elizabeth Street, Creek Street, Adelaide Street and George Street before returning to the cathedral. Those of other faiths honoured O'Quinn with Rabbi Phillips being part of the funeral procession while the great bell of St John's Anglican cathedral tolled throughout the procession to demonstrate the respect of the Anglican community. When the procession returned to St Stephen's, O'Quinn's coffin was lowered into the vault prepared by architect Andrea Stombuco and covered with a marble slab.

O'Quinn bequeathed everything he had to the Diocese of Brisbane.

== Memorials ==
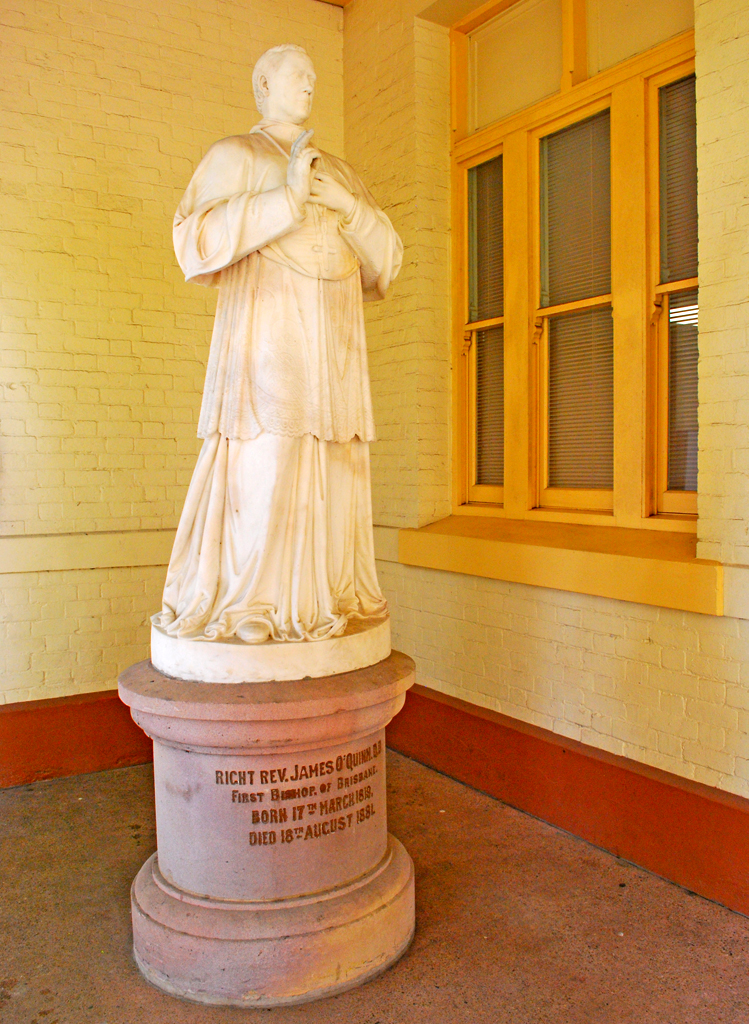
Statue of Quinn, 2012

There are a number of memorials to O'Quinn:

- a bust of by Achille Simonetti at All Hallows' School
- a marble tablet in the Roman Catholic church in Ipswich by John Petrie (1882)
- a lifesize statue by Achille Simonetti in St Stephen's Cathedral (1892)

Catholic Church titles
Preceded by new creation	1st Catholic Bishop of Brisbane; 1859–1881	Succeeded by Robert Dunne
