= 400 George Street =

Building in Brisbane, Australia

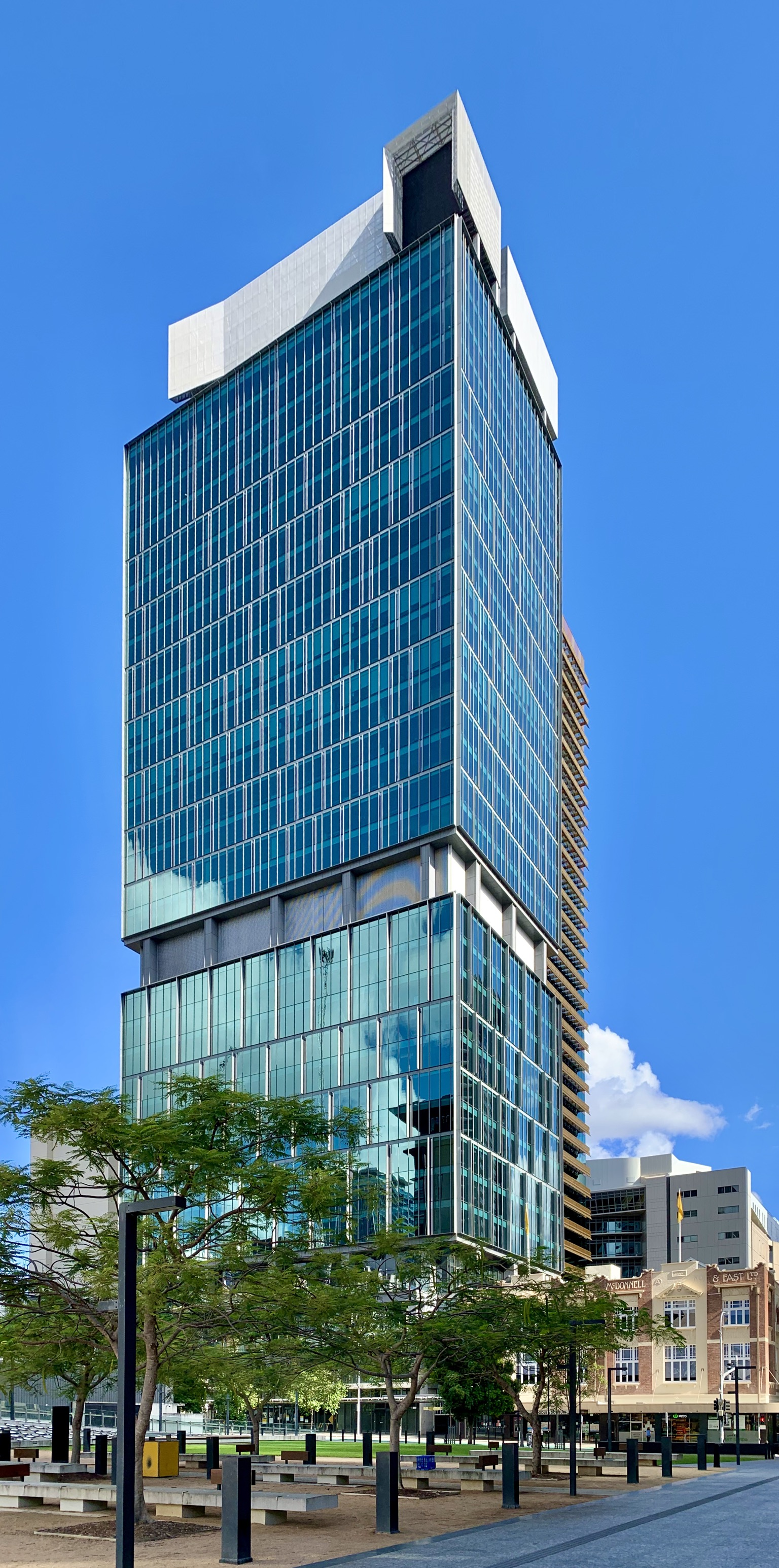
- Interactive map of the 400 George Street area

General information
- Status: Completed
- Type: Office
- Location: 400 George Street, Brisbane, Australia
- Coordinates: 27.4686°S 153.0207°E
- Construction started: 2006
- Completed: 2009
- Opening: 9 December 2009
- Cost: A$270 million
- Owner: Cromwell Property Group
- Operator: Cromwell Property Group

Height
- Roof: 150 m (490 ft)

Technical details
- Floor count: 34
- Floor area: 43,000 m^{2} (460,000 sq ft)

Design and construction
- Architect: Cox Architecture
- Developer: Leighton Properties
- Structural engineer: Robert Bird Group
- Main contractor: Thiess

400 George Street is a commercial office building in Brisbane, Queensland, Australia. Construction began in 2006 and was completed in November 2009.

== History ==
The building was designed by Cox Architecture and built by Thiess. The cost of the building's construction was $270 million, and it provides 43,000 square metres of floor area. Foyer artwork was curated by Jacqueline Armitstead (Armitstead ART Consulting) with three integrated artworks undertaken by Donna Marcus, Gemma Smith and Kenji Uranishi, commissioned in accordance with Brisbane City Council's Art for Public Places policy. In 2010, the project was awarded an AIA Queensland Chapter Regional Commendation for Commercial Architecture and a Regional Commendation for Art & Architecture.

400 George Street has a five-star rating on the Green Star sustainability scale.

== Location ==
Alongside Santos Place and 275 George Street, 400 George forms part of the North Quarter Precinct in Brisbane's CBD. A major feature of this project is its direct link with the Kurilpa Bridge which extends over the Brisbane River to the Gallery of Modern Art and South Bank cultural precinct. The skyscraper is also located on one of the busiest streets in the CBD, George Street, which forms a majority of the Government Precinct.

The building is near central transport links such as the Roma Street railway station as well as Brisbane's Busway with access at King George Square and Queen Street Mall. The building is also close to major shopping precincts such as Queen Street Mall, Wintergarden and Elizabeth Street all of which feature shopping, restaurants, bars, and nightclubs.

== Features ==
The building contains 200 bike parking spaces, e-bike charging ports, 530 lockers and 26 showers. Entrance is via touchless entry doors.

== Tenants ==
Office tenants in the building include a range of state and federal government agencies and departments, as well as private industry. This includes the Australian Competition and Consumer Commission, the Office of the Health Ombudsman, the Australian Energy Regulator, InterGen, the Queensland Law Reform Commission, Microsoft, and a range of barristers. In April 2013 a 50% interest in the building was sold to the Motor Accident Commission for A$196 million.

== See also ==
- List of tallest buildings in Brisbane
