= Oscar Towers =

- Interactive map of the Oscar Towers area
- Former names: 204 Alice Street
- Alternative names: The Oscar

General information
- Location: Brisbane, Queensland, Australia, 204 Alice Street
- Coordinates: 27.472350°S 153.029501°E
- Cost: A$1.3 billion

Height
- Height: TA: 273.5 m (897.3 ft); TM: 244.2 m (801.2 ft)

Technical details
- Floor count: TA: 79; TM: 71

Design and construction
- Developer: Meriton

The Oscar Towers are a residential skyscraper complex in Brisbane, Australia, which is currently under construction. Designed by DBI, the two towers comprising the complex will stand at a height of 273.5 and 244.2 metres.

== History ==
The complex, designed by architecture firm DBI Architects, is being developed by Australian developer Meriton. In 2023, Meriton acquired the site of a 1970s residential complex for around AUD 130 million, following a lengthy property amalgamation process involving more than 80 individual owners.

In January 2024, a development application was submitted for a project valued at approximately AUD 1.3 billion. Approval from the Brisbane City Council was granted in November 2024. The development forms part of Brisbane’s broader push toward vertical densification of the city centre, driven by urban growth and the transformations associated with the 2032 Olympic Games.

== Description ==
The complex is located on Alice Street, directly opposite the Brisbane City Botanic Gardens in Brisbane's CBD.

The project involves the demolition of the existing 1970s building and the construction of two residential towers of 79 and 70 storeys. The taller tower will reach approximately 274 metres, the maximum height permitted under Brisbane's aviation regulations for the CBD, making it one of the tallest buildings in the city.

The complex will include over 700 apartments, as well as retail spaces, dining venues, childcare facilities, and shared amenities such as swimming pools, a gym, and outdoor areas distributed across a 5-storey podium. The planning scheme also includes a new publicly accessible pedestrian link between Alice Street and Margaret Street, aiming to better integrate the development into the urban fabric and enhance its connection to the City Botanic Gardens and the riverfront.

== See also ==
- List of tallest buildings in Australia
- List of tallest buildings in Brisbane
- Brisbane Skytower
