= Waterfront Brisbane =

- Interactive map of the Waterfront Brisbane area

General information
- Location: Brisbane, Queensland, Australia
- Coordinates: 27.469184°S 153.030533°E
- Cost: A$2.5 billion

Design and construction
- Developer: Dexus

Waterfront Brisbane is a mixed-use skyscraper complex in Brisbane, Australia, which is currently under construction. Designed by architecture firms FJC Studio and Arkhefield, the two towers comprising the complex will rise to a height of 238 m and 214 m.

== History ==
The complex, designed by architecture firms FJC Studio and Arkhefield, is being developed by the Australian property company Dexus. The master plan for the approximately AUD 2.5 billion project received approval from the Brisbane City Council in 2020.

Construction, carried out by John Holland, began in 2023 and is being delivered in phases. The first phase includes the demolition of the existing buildings, foundation works, the construction of a new riverwalk, public spaces, retail pavilions, the complex's shared podium, and the North Tower, which is scheduled for completion in 2028. The South Tower will be built in a subsequent phase, completing the overall development.

== Description ==
The complex is located on the Brisbane CBD riverfront and will serve as a mixed-use development comprising office, retail, and leisure spaces.

The project includes two office towers of approximately 49 and 43 storeys, with a combined gross floor area of around 130,000 m². The towers will be connected at their base by a shared podium and complemented by new retail pavilions and public spaces overlooking the river.

== See also ==
- List of tallest buildings in Australia
- List of tallest buildings in Brisbane
