= 205 North Quay =

Skyscraper in the city of Brisbane, Queensland, Australia

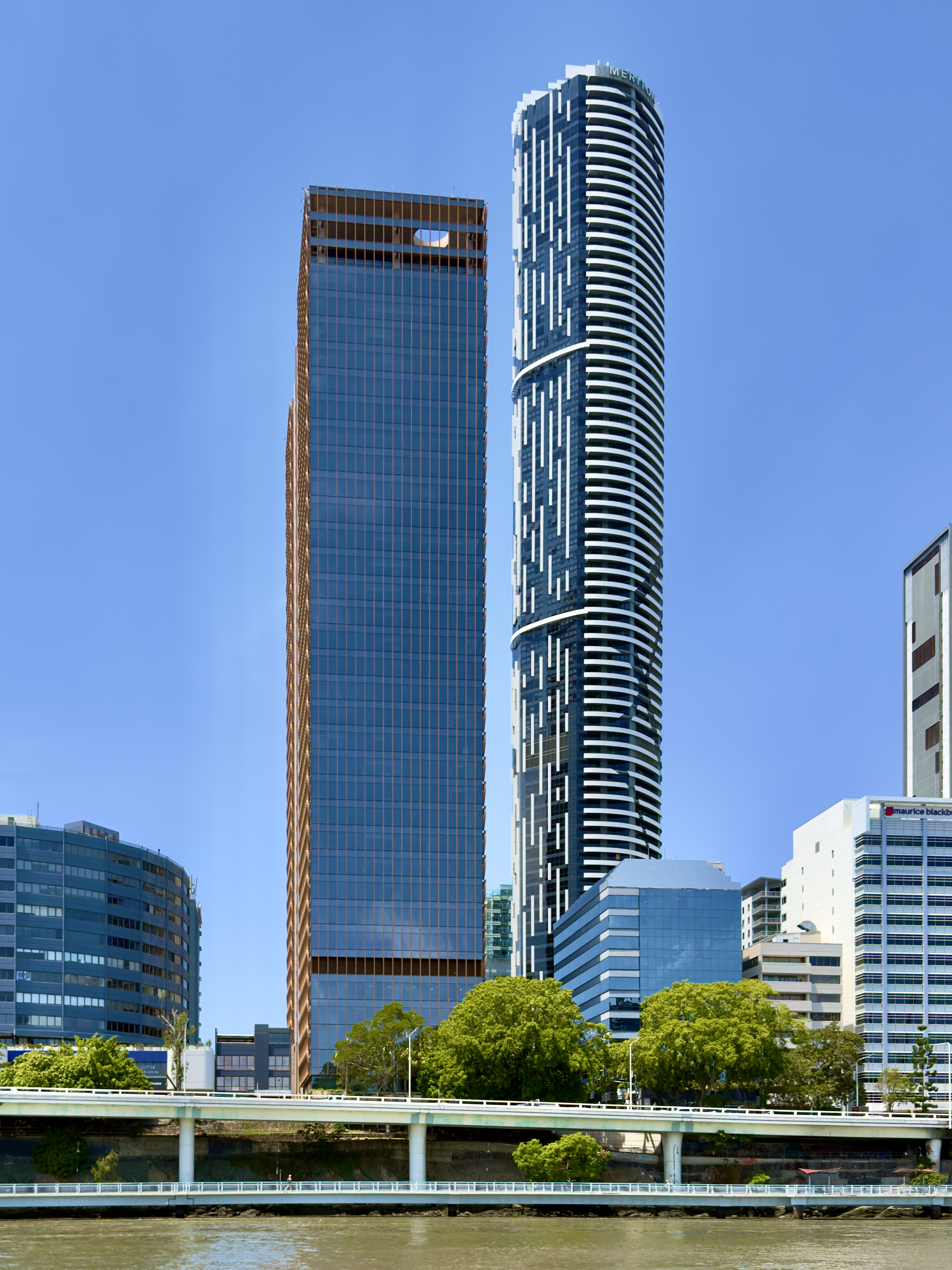
- 205 North Quay, 2026
- Interactive map of the 205 North Quay area

General information
- Status: Completed
- Location: 205 North Quay, Brisbane
- Coordinates: 27.4678°S 153.0184°E
- Owner: Cbus Property

Height
- Roof: 172.1 m (565 ft)

Technical details
- Floor count: 37

Design and construction
- Structural engineer: ADG Engineers

205 North Quay is a 37-storey skyscraper in the city of Brisbane, Queensland, Australia. The tower, which provides office space, was designed by Hassell, REX and Richards & Spence after a design competition was held in 2019. The design includes outdoor terraces on every level and rooftop facilities.

The project was developed by Cbus Property and Nielson Properties, together with Brisbane’s Raniga family, and constructed by Hutchinson Builders, costing a reported $600 million AUD. Construction completed in December 2024.

The anchor tenant of 205 North Quay, occupying 33 floors, is Services Australia, whose move into the building upon its opening served to amalgamate their numerous prior lease holdings in Brisbane into one central office location. The building does not feature a Services Australia customer service centre.

The ground floor features an auditorium and level 2 houses a gym, wellness studio, shower facilities and a 25 m (82 ft) swimming pool.

== See also ==
- List of tallest buildings in Brisbane
