= Law Courts, Brisbane =

Demolished court building in Queensland, Australia

Law Courts Complex
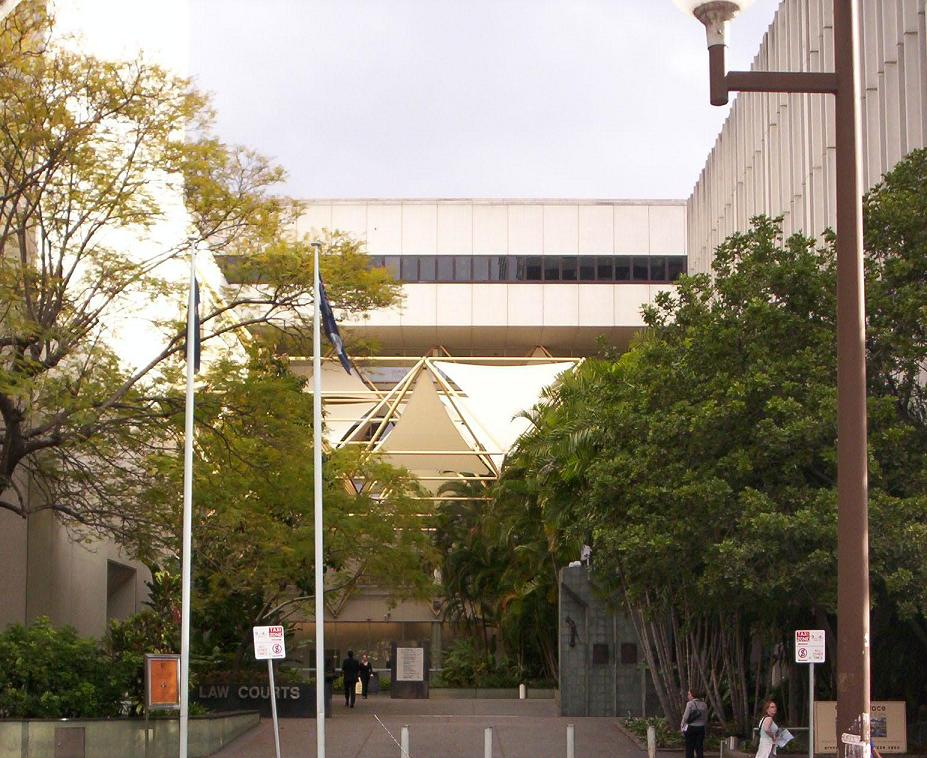
- George Street face of the Law Courts Complex.

- Location within Queensland

General information
- Location: Brisbane, Queensland, 304 George Street, Australia
- Coordinates: 27°28′12.27″S 153°01′19.5″E
- Demolished: January 2015
- Landlord: Supreme Court of Queensland; District Court of Queensland

The Law Courts Complex was a building located on George Street and Adelaide Street, in Brisbane, Queensland, Australia. The building formerly housed the Supreme Court and District Court of Queensland, which relocated to the Queen Elizabeth II Courts of Law in August 2012.

== History ==
The Law Courts Complex was constructed on the site of the original Supreme Court building, which had been largely destroyed by arson on 1 September, 1968. The remains of this building were demolished in October, 1976, and construction of the first stage of the complex commenced on the western end of the site. Once completed, this first stage held only the Supreme Court. The Supreme Court was relocated to the second, and larger stage of the complex upon its completion in the early 1980s, while the District Court began to occupy the now vacant first stage soon after.

Following the relocation of the Supreme and District Courts to the Queen Elizabeth II Courts of Law in August 2012, the Law Courts Complex was decommissioned.

In May 2013 it was announced that the Law Courts site bordered by George, Adelaide and Ann streets and North Quay was sold to the Taiwan-based developer the Shayher Group. The new development proposed for the site is called 300 George Street.

Major demolition works were completed on the site by January 2015.

== Gallery ==
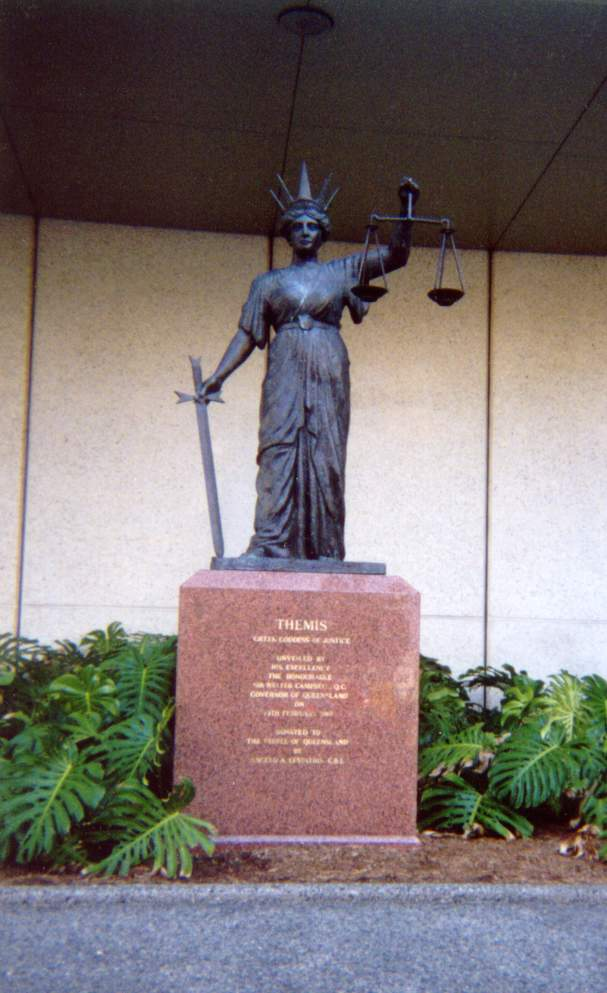
"Themis" — "Greek Goddess of Justice"

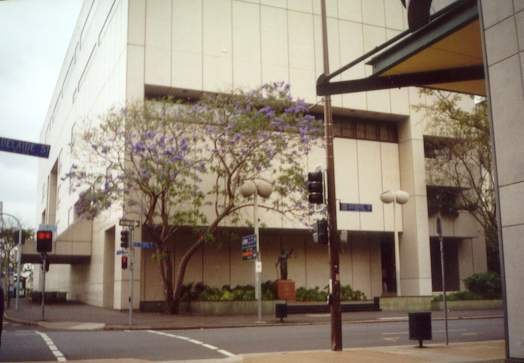
With "Themis" — "Greek Goddess of Justice"

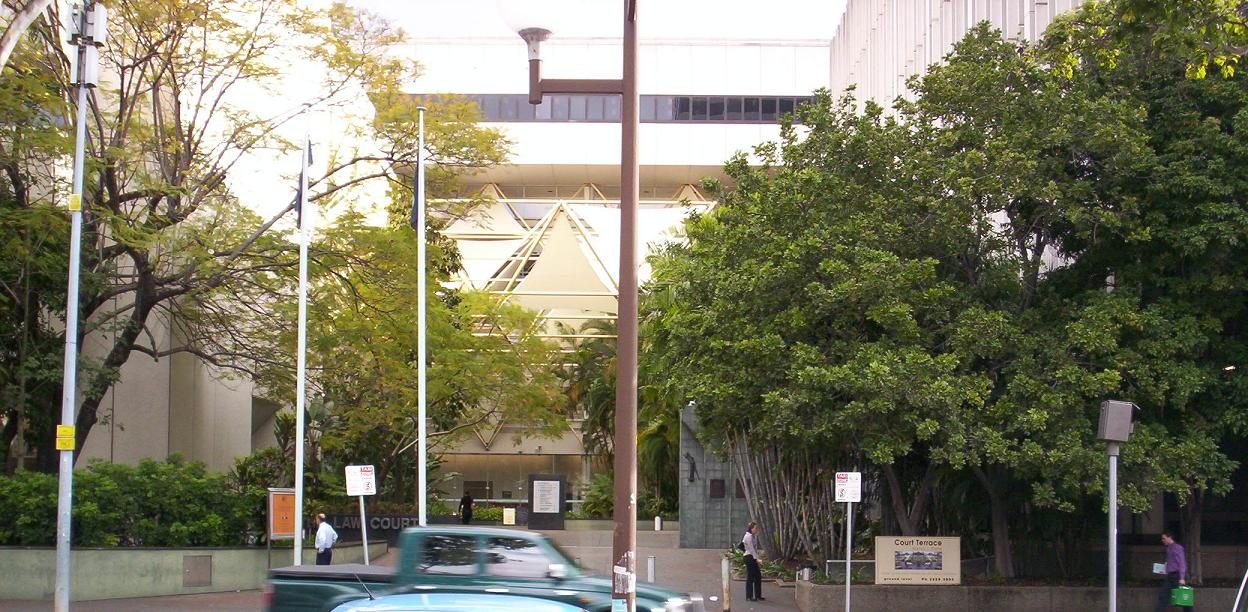
The George Street facade of the Law Courts Complex

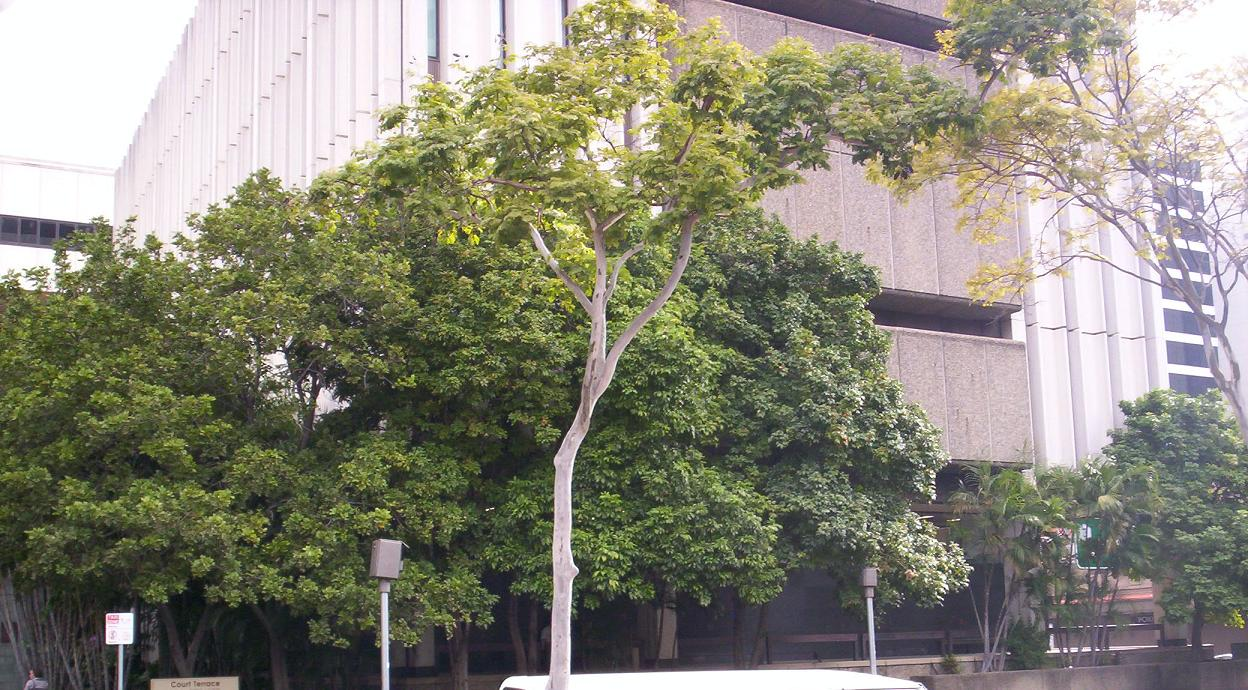
The George Street facade of the Law Courts Complex

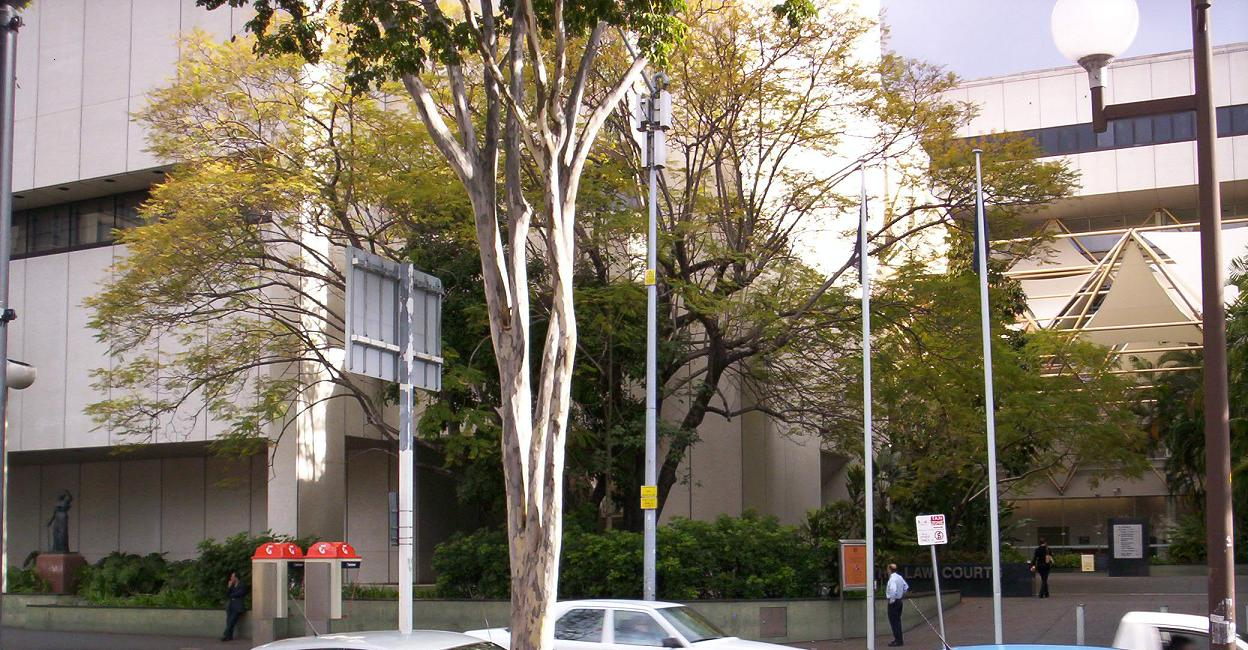
The George Street facade of the Law Courts Complex

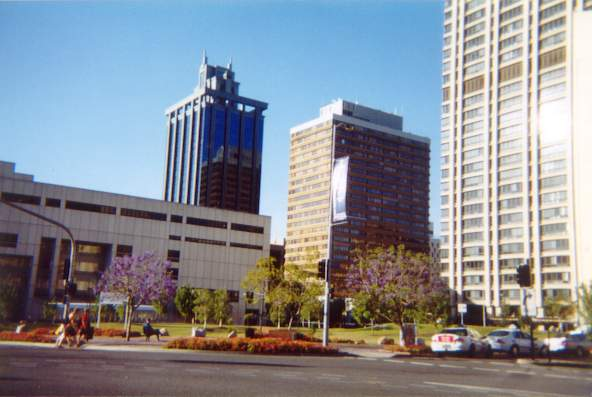
The Adelaide Street facade of the Law Courts Complex with the State Law Building behind it. The garden park area, in front, is where Brisbane Square now stands
