= Brisbane Quarter =

Development consisting of three buildings; apartments, and office tower in Brisbane

Coordinates: 27°28′12.27″S 153°01′19.5″E

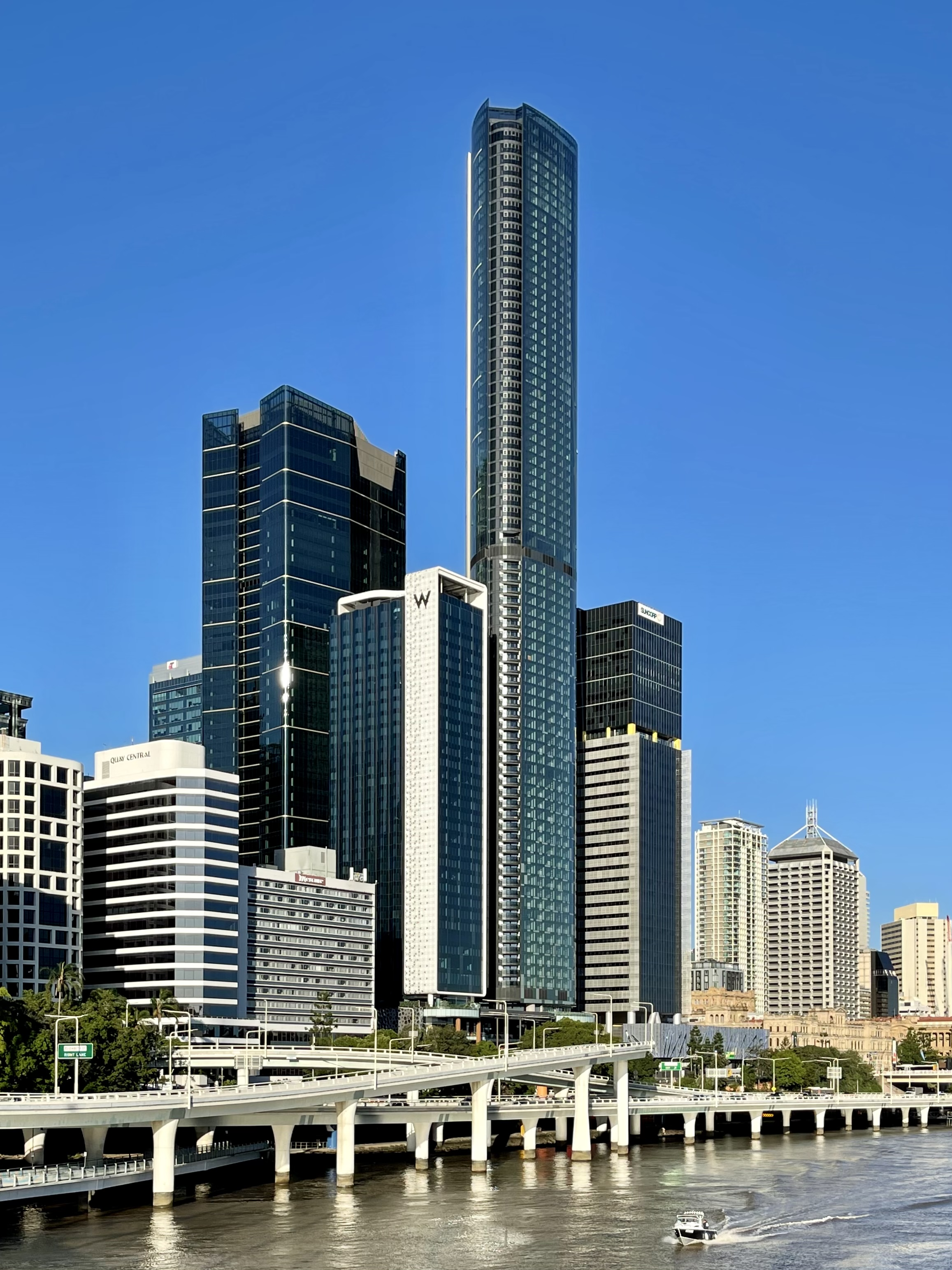
- Brisbane Quarter buildings: 300 George, W Brisbane Hotel, The One, Brisbane (from left to right)
- Interactive map of the Brisbane Quarter area

General information
- Status: Completed
- Location: 300 George Street, Brisbane, Queensland; Australia
- Completed: 2021
- Opening: T1: October 2021; T2: June 2018; T3: October 2019
- Cost: A$800 million

Height
- Roof: T1: 274 m (899 ft); T2: 126.3 m (414 ft); T3: 182.2 m (598 ft)

Technical details
- Floor count: T1: 82; T2: 34; T3: 41
- Floor area: T1: 68,781 m^{2} (740,350 sq ft); T2: 39,518 m^{2} (425,370 sq ft); T3: 58,209 m^{2} (626,560 sq ft)
- Lifts/elevators: T1: 8; T2: TBC; T3: 16

Design and construction
- Architect: Zenx Architects
- Developer: Shayher Group, Par Jar Group
- Engineer: Floth Sustainable Building Consultants (HVAC, Electrical, Lifts, Hydraulics, Wet & Dry Fire, ESD); Hera Engineering (Structural); Bonacci Group (Structural)

Website
- theoneresidences.com.au

Brisbane Quarter (also known as 300 George Street) is a high-rise development that consists of three buildings; a residential tower, a hotel tower and an office tower, on the old Law Courts site bounded by George Street, Adelaide Street, Ann Street and North Quay in Brisbane, Queensland, Australia.

The development includes:

- The One (Tower 1) 274-metre (899 ft), 82-storey residential tower on the corner of North Quay and Adelaide Street. The tower, designed by Zenx Architects, will include 467 apartments. It is Brisbane's second–tallest building. The One opened in October 2021;
- W Brisbane Hotel (Tower 2) 126.3-metre (414 ft), 34-storey hotel tower on the corner of Ann Street and North Quay. The tower, designed by DBI Architects, is occupied by five-star W Hotels and includes 312 hotel rooms, presidential & executive suites, health spa with pools. W Brisbane opened in June 2018;
- 300 George (Tower 3) 182.2-metre (598 ft), 41-storey office tower on the corner of George and Ann streets. The tower, designed by Zenx Architects, consists of 58,209m2 of office space. 300 George opened in October 2019.

A shopping mall, including a master ballroom, conference facilities and retail outlets, is proposed for the podium at the base of the towers on the first three floors.

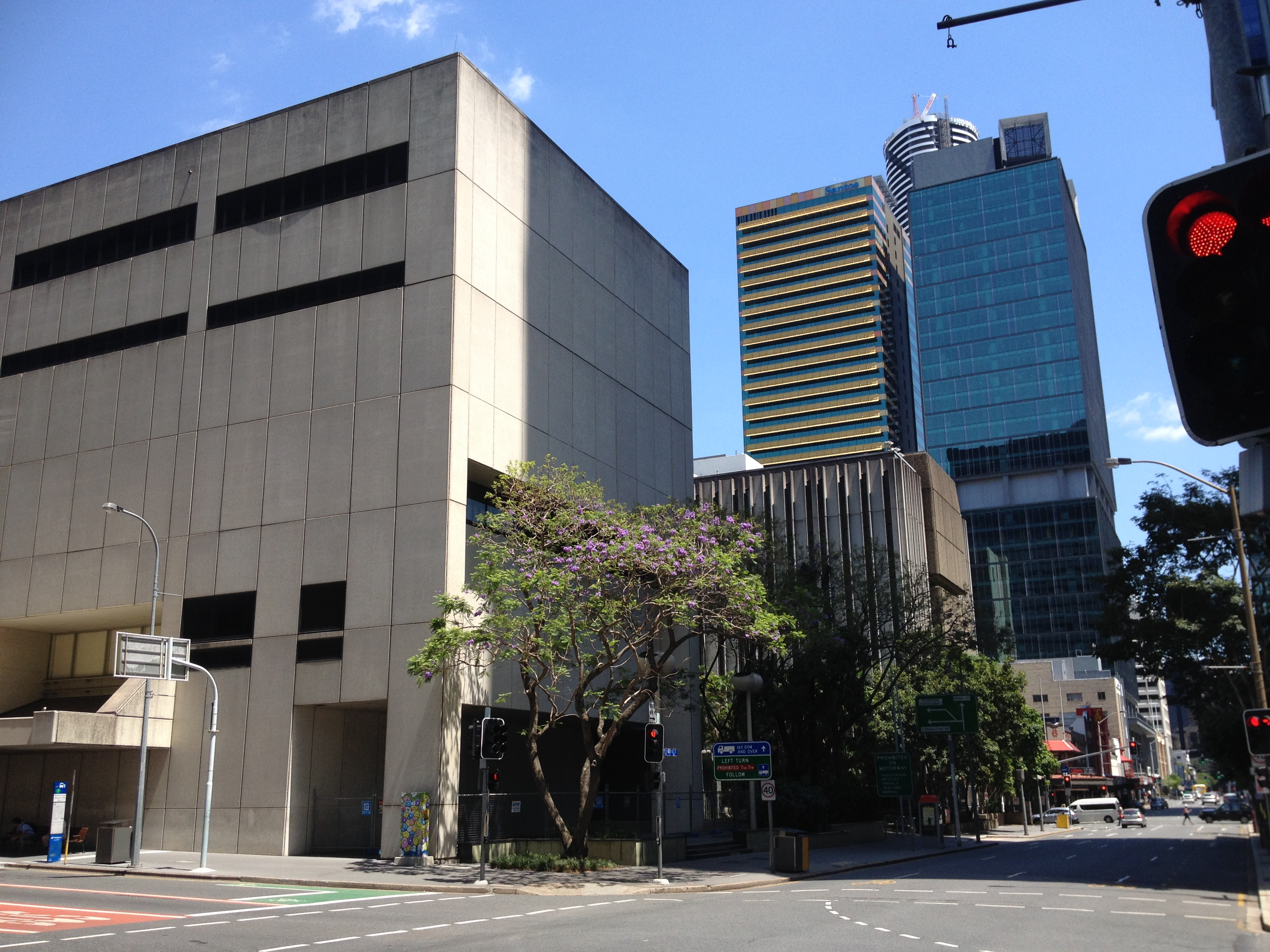
Former Law Courts buildings in November 2013

The former Law Courts site was purchased by the Shayher Group, part of the Taiwan-based developer Par Jar Group in May 2013. The development application was lodged with the Brisbane City Council in November and approved in December 2013.

Demolition of the old law court buildings commenced in early 2014, and construction works commenced in 2015.

== See also ==
- List of tallest buildings in Brisbane
