= Aurora Tower =

Skyscraper in Brisbane, Queensland, Australia

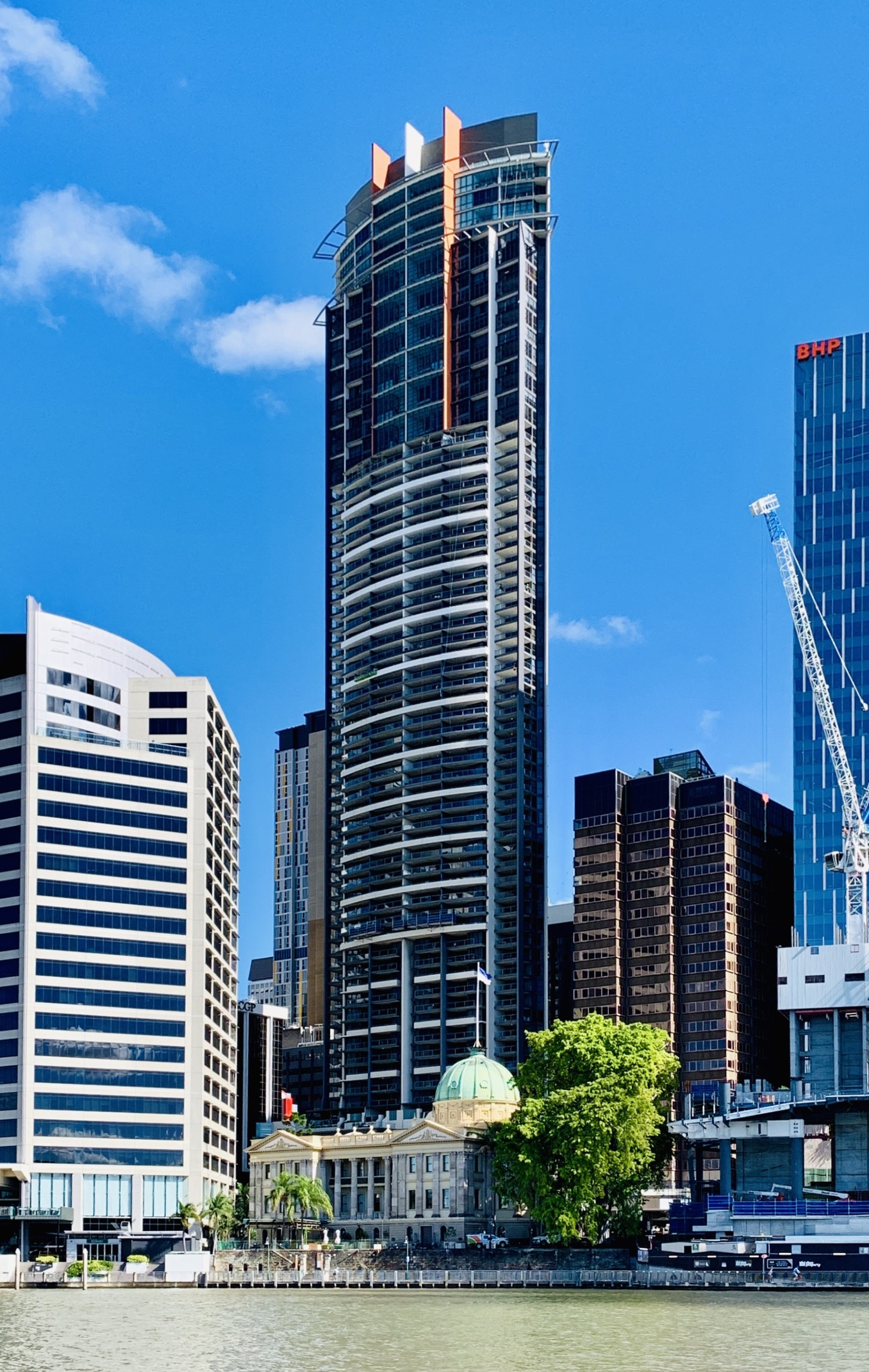
- Interactive map of the Aurora Tower area

General information
- Status: Completed
- Type: Residential
- Location: 420 Queen Street; Brisbane, QLD
- Coordinates: 27°27′54.48″S 153°1′49.56″E
- Construction started: 2003
- Completed: 2006
- Opening: 5 May 2006

Height
- Roof: 207 m (679 ft)

Technical details
- Floor count: 69

Design and construction
- Architect: Cottee Parker Architects
- Developer: APH Properties/ Amalgamated Property Group

Aurora Tower is a skyscraper in Brisbane, Queensland, Australia. It is 207 metres tall and was the tallest building in Brisbane from 2006 until being surpassed by Soleil in 2011. Aurora has 69 storeys comprising four floors of 18 penthouses, 54 skyhomes (two-storey luxury apartments) and 408 apartments. It features a heated pool, entertainment area and cinema for residents. Aurora Tower opened to the public on 5 May 2006.

Aurora was designed to use iris recognition technology for security purposes, however this technology has not yet been put into use. Along with the intercom system and lifts, it has had problems functioning correctly. Another criticism has been the lack of car parks.

The Tower is near central transport links such as the Central railway station. The Tower is also close to shopping areas such as QueensPlaza, Queen Street Mall, Wintergarden and Elizabeth Street all of which feature shopping, restaurants, bars, and nightclubs. The location was the site of a dwelling built in 1837 for the first free settler in the Moreton Bay Settlement, Andrew Petrie.

Other Brisbane landmarks such as the Story Bridge, Central Plaza 1 and Brisbane City Hall are visible from inside the tower.

To ensure occupant comfort at the top of the building wind tunnel testing was conducted by the structural designers. Other innovative design and construction measures were needed due to the slender form of the building.

In January 2008, the body corporate informed owners that the building's management rights were acquired by the Oaks Group. At the same time an application with the Brisbane City Council to change the class of the building to short-term accommodation by the Oaks Group, raised concerns by residents that the building's facilities may be overwhelmed by hotel guests.

The site of Aurora Tower was proposed in 1992 to be the site for the Brisbane 2000 tower. The proposed tower was to be 250 m (820 ft) tall, which at the time would have made it one of the tallest buildings in Australia.

== See also ==
- List of tallest buildings in Australia
- List of tallest buildings in Brisbane
