= Central Plaza 1 =

Skyscraper in the city of Brisbane, Queensland, Australia

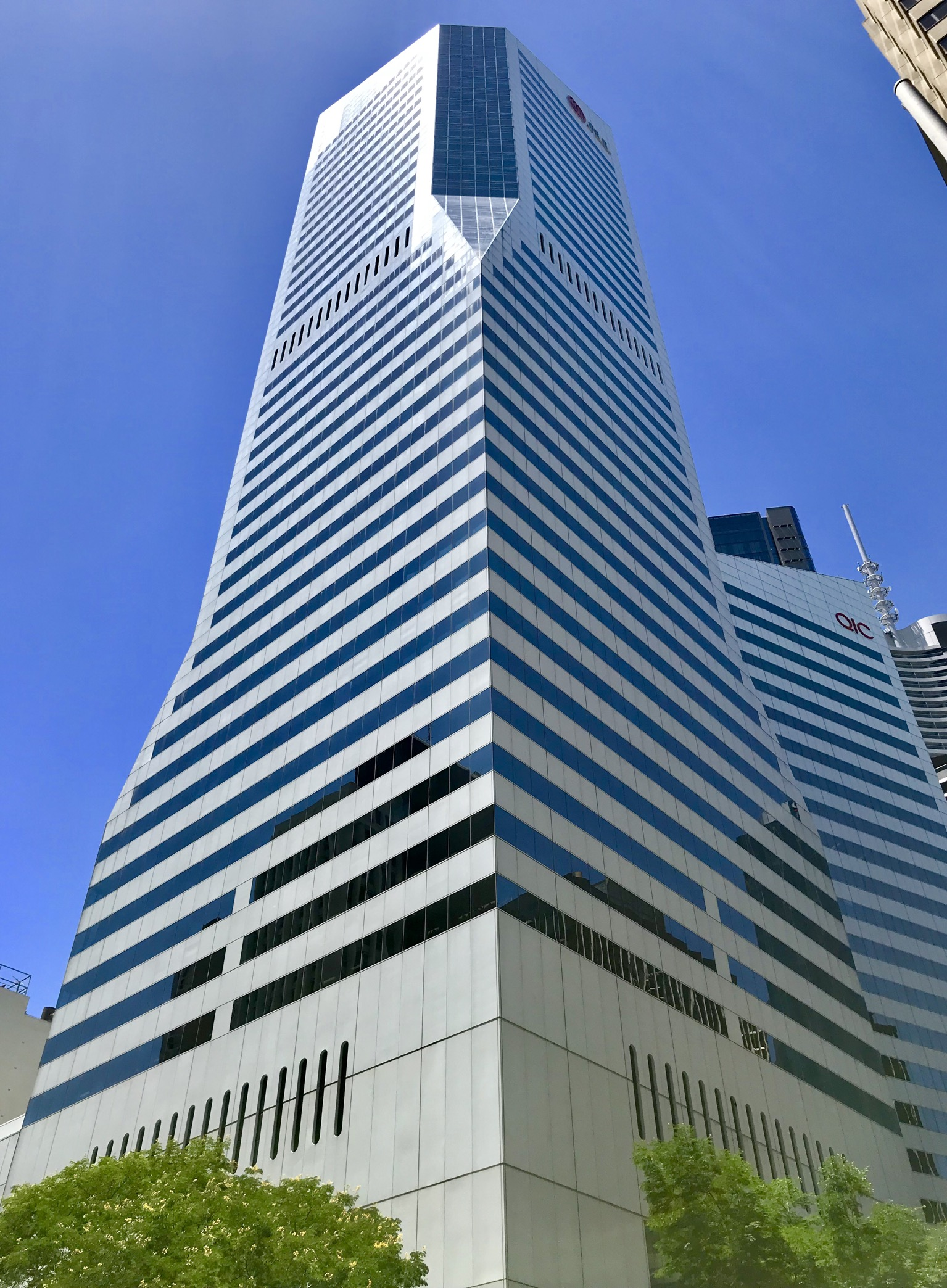
- Central Plaza 1
- Interactive map of the Central Plaza 1 area

General information
- Status: Completed
- Type: Office
- Location: 345 Queen Street, Brisbane
- Coordinates: 27.46706°S 153.0291117°E
- Completed: 1988
- Owner: Aravest (50%); IFM Investors (50%)
- Operator: IFM Investors

Height
- Roof: 174 m (571 ft)

Technical details
- Floor count: 44

Design and construction
- Architect: Kurokawa Kisho

Central Plaza 1 is a skyscraper in the city of Brisbane, Queensland, Australia, which was designed by renowned Japanese architect Kurokawa Kisho. The height of the tower is 174 m (571 ft) with 44 floors.

Construction was completed in 1988 and it became synonymous with the Australian Bicentenary and World Expo 88. It is located at 345 Queen Street on the corner of Creek Street in the Brisbane central business district. The building is owned by Industry Superannuation Property Trust, who bought the building for A$385 million. In December 2025, ISPT sold a 50% stake in the building to Singapore-based Aravest for A$230 million.

At the time of its completion it was the tallest building in Brisbane, holding this title until Riparian Plaza's completion in 2005.

Located next to Central Plaza 1 is Central Plaza 2, a smaller version of the tower with a similar design, which has a height of 110 m. In 2008, Central Plaza 3 was built, standing 57 metres tall, completing the Central Plaza Complex.

Central Plaza 1 has a unique window cleaning mechanism in which a section at the top of the building rotates, allowing for the suspension of outdoor window cleaners.

The building is recognized as one of Australia's most prominent structures, featuring spacious foyers, a modern facade, and advanced technology systems..

The tower formerly featured AAMI signs located outside and on top of the building as well as a customer service branch on the ground floor, which resulted in it being nicknamed the AAMI Building. Following a transition of management to JLL, AAMI signage was replaced by JLL signage on top and on the ground levels.

== See also ==
- List of tallest buildings in Brisbane
