= Riparian Plaza =

Skyscraper in Brisbane, Queensland, Australia

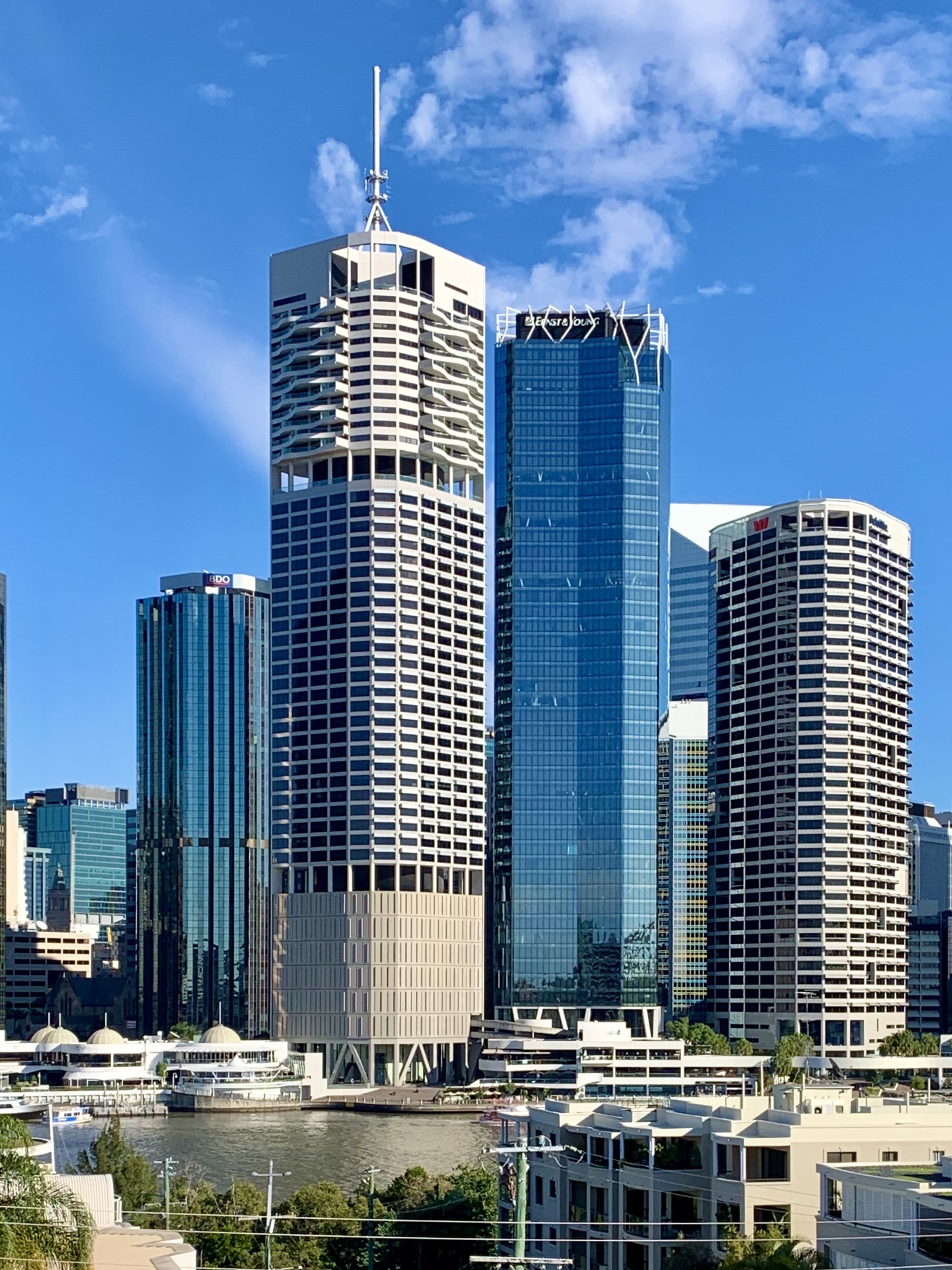

General information
- Status: Completed
- Type: Mixed-use
- Architectural style: Australian modernist
- Location: 71 Eagle Street, Brisbane, Queensland
- Coordinates: 27.468136°S 153.030072°E
- Construction started: 2002
- Completed: 2005; 21 years ago
- Opening: 2005

Height
- Antenna spire: 250 m (820 ft)
- Roof: 200 m (660 ft)
- Top floor: 188 m (617 ft)

Technical details
- Floor count: 53
- Floor area: 55,000 m^{2} (590,000 sq ft)
- Lifts/elevators: 13

Design and construction
- Architect: Harry Seidler
- Developer: Bloomberg
- Structural engineer: Robert Bird Group
- Main contractor: Multiplex

Website
- riparianplaza.com.au

Riparian Plaza is a 53-storey skyscraper located in the central business district of Brisbane, Queensland, Australia. The building stands at 250 m (820 ft) in height to its communications spire and 200 m (660 ft) to its roof. It was Brisbane's tallest building until it was surpassed by Aurora in 2006 and is a particularly iconic building on the Brisbane skyline. It is a mixed use building, with 11 car park levels from the ground up, 25 commercial levels, and 12 residential levels originally housing 50 penthouse apartments.

On top of the tower is a 50 m (160 ft) communications spire. A recreation centre including a swimming pool is located on 39th floor, between the commercial and residential sections. The carpark is accessed via a helical annexe. The tower has an open plaza and promenade space totaling 3,500 m^{2} (38,000 sq ft). The upper plaza level contains Madame Wu, an Asian Fusion restaurant.

The building was developed by Bloomberg Incorporation Limited with a construction cost of A$130 million. Bloomberg retained ownership of the 30,000 m^{2} (320,000 sq ft) commercial component and sold off the residential apartments during construction. It is located at 71 Eagle Street, and was the last waterfront vacant block in the Brisbane CBD. Riparian Plaza provided the first, new, premium office space available in the Brisbane CBD for a decade. The building has a total floor area of approximately 55,000 m^{2} (590,000 sq ft). Brisbane Square completed in 2006, was the next major office building constructed in Brisbane.

== Construction and design ==
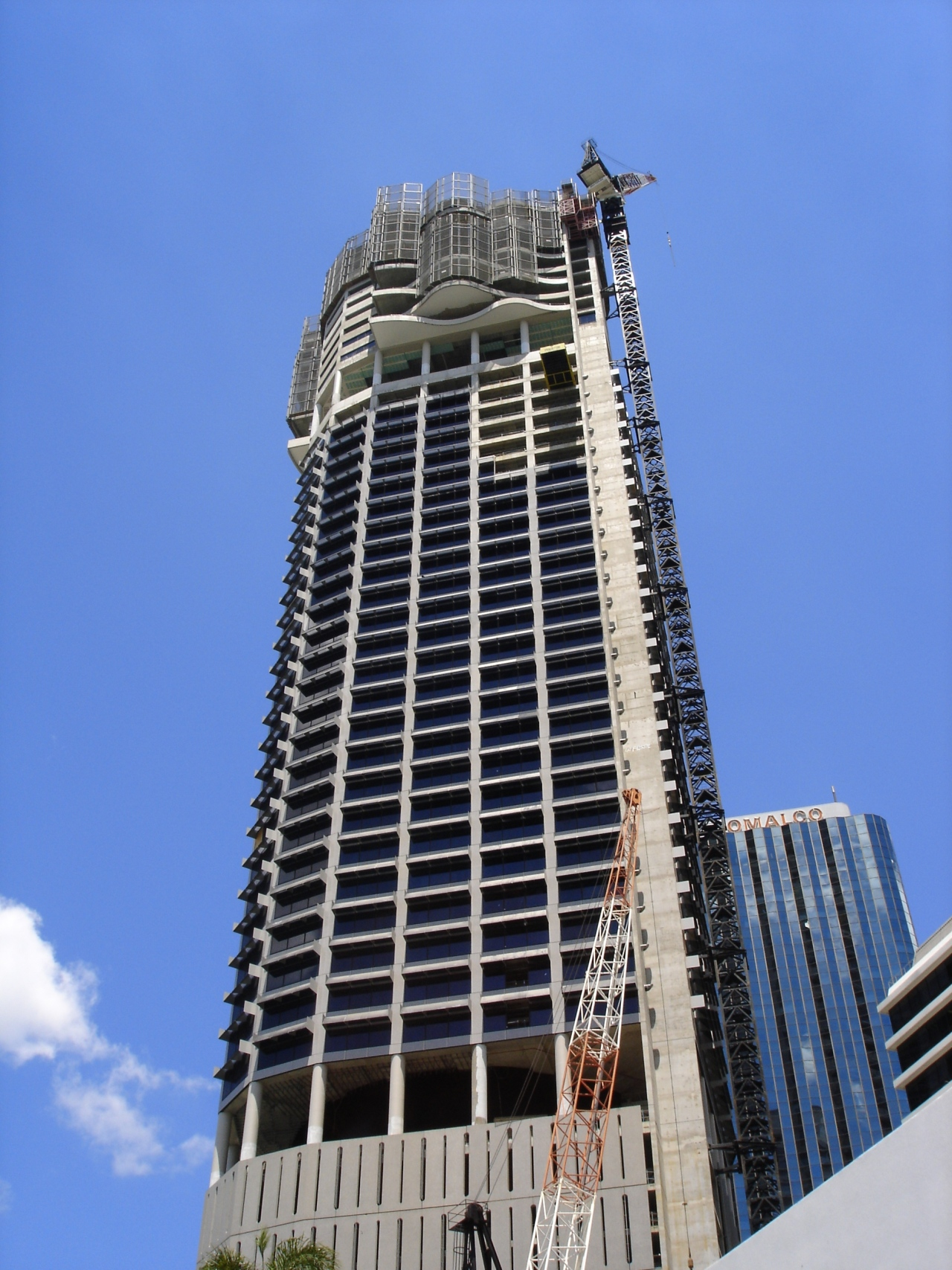
View of Riparian Plaza during construction, 2004

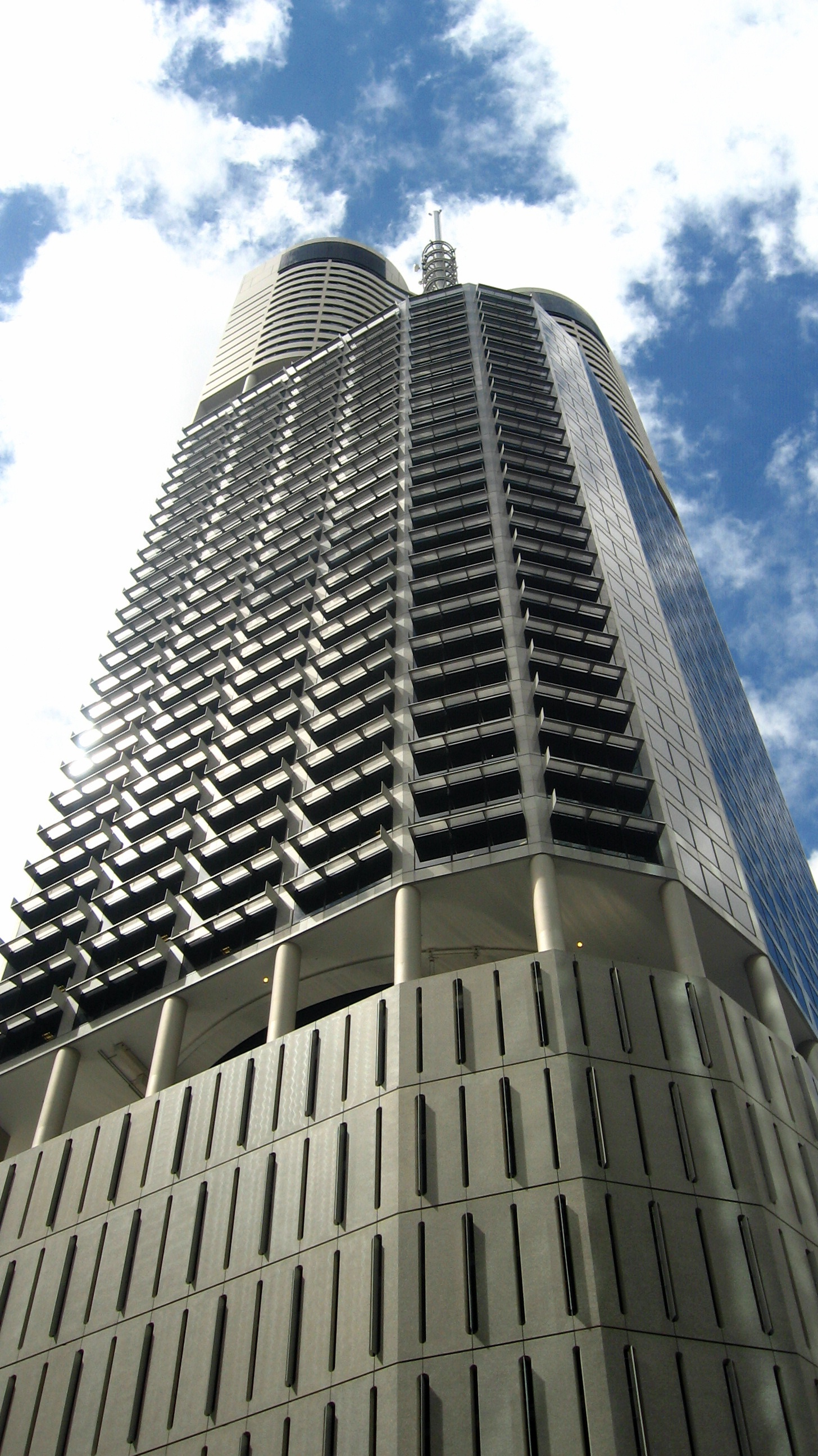
Riparian Plaza from street level

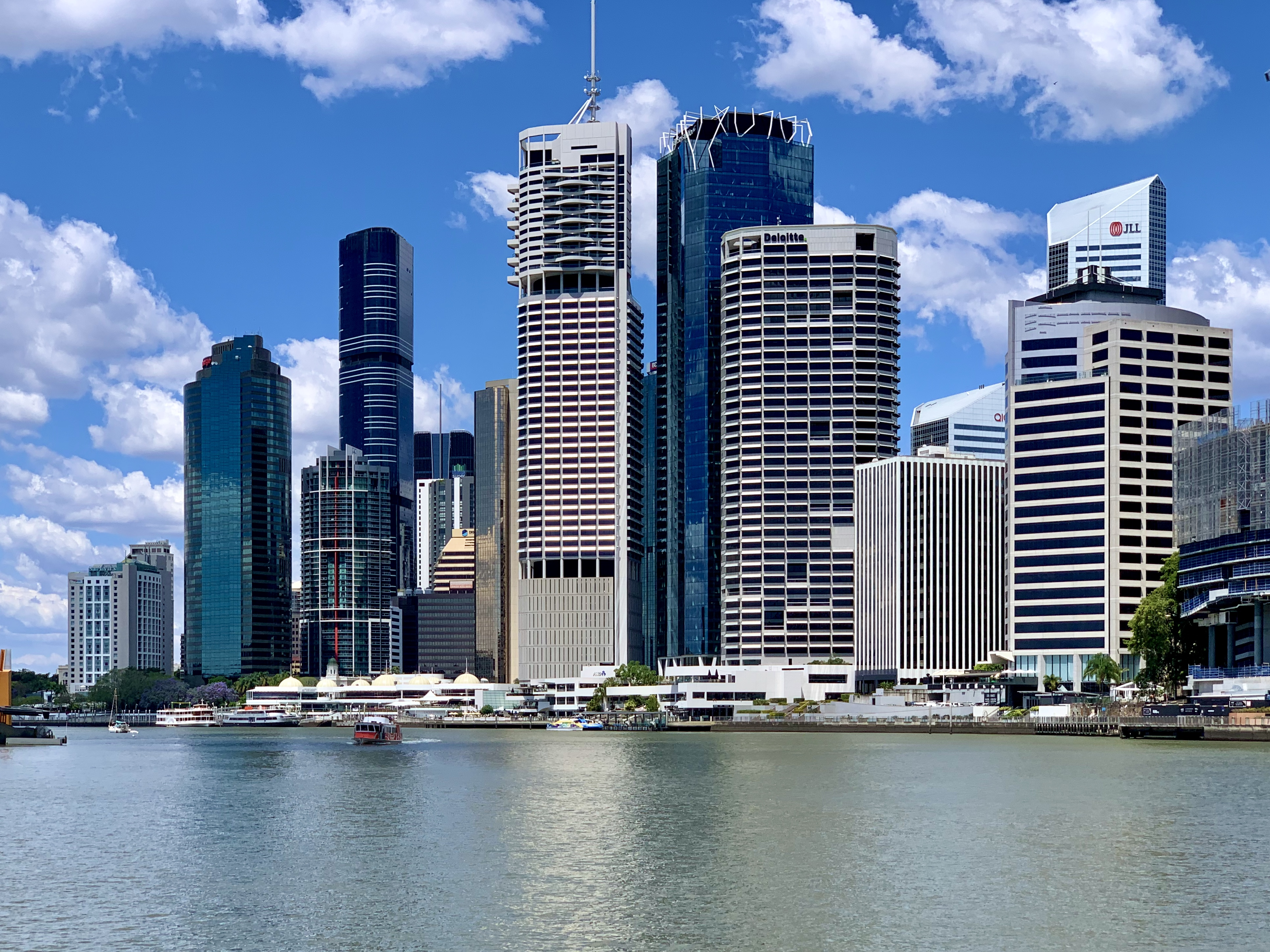
Riparian Plaza and financial district by the Brisbane River

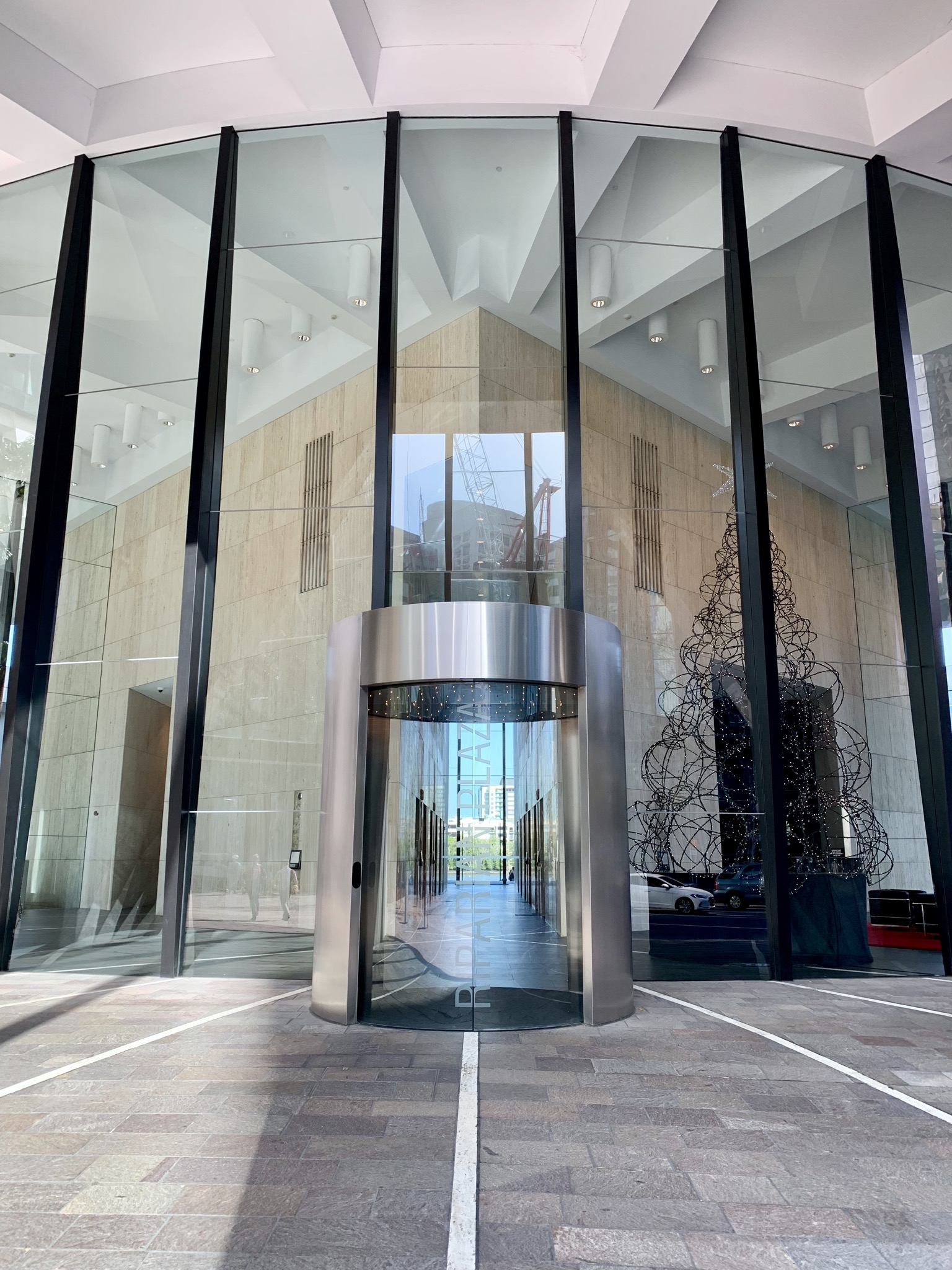
Glass entry and foyer

Riparian Plaza was designed by Harry Seidler (architect) and Robert Bird Group (structural engineer). It was the last major project that Seidler worked on. Most office spaces have river views, due to the 45-degree angle to the river of the building and the lack of columns on these mid level floors. Each penthouse has its own curvilinear, projecting terrace that faces the river. The cantilevering balconies have a highly sculptured shape. Seidler claimed the composite stacking of sectors vertically is unique in Australia.

The shape of the tower has been carefully formed to maximise the outlook for occupants up and down the river. The base sector houses parking, the mid segment is column-free offices and the reshaped top consists of the greatest apartments we have ever designed.

— Harry Seidler

There were significant delays in the completion of the building. It was originally scheduled to be completed by early 2004 (giving a record construction time of 100 weeks). This date was continually pushed back. The delay led to significant criticism of the project in the local media, as well as complaints from prospective tenants of the building and withdrawal of committed tenants. The building was completed in November 2005.

In October 2007, Riparian Plaza won the top prize for commercial architecture at the annual national architecture awards. In 2008, the building won the overall winner of the Rider Levett Bucknall / Property Council of Australia Award and the Property Council of Australia Award for Mixed Use Development.

== Incidents ==
The building made headlines in 2005 when a severe storm caused two window washers to become stranded on the 30th floor. Rescue operations were successful after a pane of glass was removed to reach them.

A large panel of glass from pool fencing on level 39 crashed to Eagle Street in the early morning hours of 27 August 2009, creating a mess but no injuries.

== Tenants ==
Office tenants include broker Wilson HTM and law firms Wotton Kearney and Clayton Utz. John Pearce, former CEO of the nearby Collection House, paid $6.7 million for the top penthouse.

The building has attracted significant investor interest with median capital growth at 24.8% during 2007 and 27% in 2008. The building currently contains only 47 apartments, however there were 52 in the original design. Due to a flexible body corporate apartment amalgamations have been permitted and even encouraged because they enhance the exclusivity and therefore the price of the apartments.

In 2022, tenants of the building tried unsuccessfully to halt the development at the neighbouring Eagle Street Pier site complaining the design was too bulky and imposing on public space.

== In popular culture ==
The exterior of the building was a filming location for the 2009 science-fiction thriller film Daybreakers.

== See also ==
- List of tallest buildings in Brisbane
- List of tallest buildings in Australia
