= 30 Albert Street, Brisbane =

Proposed skyscraper in Brisbane, Queensland

30 Albert Street
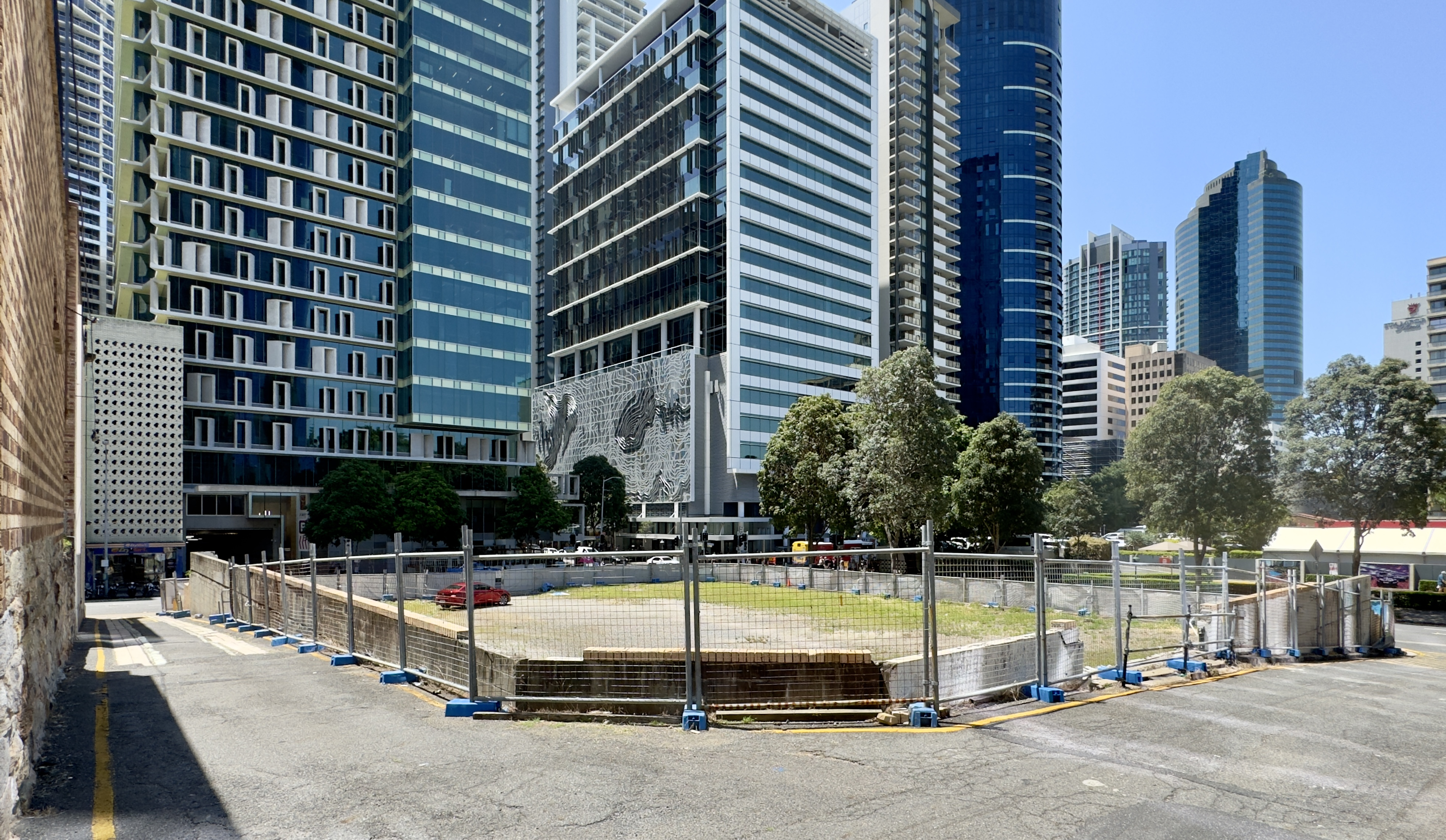
- Building site in May 2023
- Interactive map of the 30 Albert Street area

General information
- Status: Construction Approved
- Type: Residential
- Location: Brisbane, Queensland, Australia, 30 Albert Street
- Coordinates: 27.473082°S 153.028210°E

Height
- Roof: 270.5 metres (887 ft)
- Top floor: 264 metres (866 ft)

Technical details
- Floor count: 91
- Lifts/elevators: 10

Design and construction
- Architecture firm: COX Rayner Architects
- Developer: World Class Land

Other information
- Parking: 304

The 30 Albert Street is a future residential skyscraper to be located at 30 Albert Street in Brisbane, Australia. The tower will rise to 270.5m (274m AHD) which is currently the maximum height allowed in Brisbane central business district.

The 91-storey tower will include 857 apartments; one bedroom, two-bedroom, three-bedroom apartments and one penthouse. Recreation areas with pools and dining and lounge rooms will be located across three dual-level decks on the low-rise (levels 6–7), mid-rise (levels 66–67) and high-rise (levels 83–84). Retail space is planned for the ground floor levels.

Development application was lodged with the Brisbane City Council in August 2015 and replaced in August 2016.

== See also ==
- List of tallest buildings in Brisbane
