= List of tallest buildings in Brisbane =

Skyline of Brisbane
- Brisbane CBD from Mount Coot-tha
- Tallest building: Brisbane Skytower (2019)
- Tallest building height: 274.3 m (900 ft)
- First 150 m+ building: Central Plaza 1 (1988)

Number of tall buildings
- Taller than 100 m (328 ft): 71 (2025)
- Taller than 150 m (492 ft): 23 (2025)
- Taller than 200 m (656 ft): 8 (2025)

Brisbane, Australia's third most populous city and largest city by land area, is home to at least 360 completed high-rise buildings, at least 70 high-rise buildings over 100 metres in height, and has 23 completed skyscrapers (and 7 under construction as of 2025) which exceed the height of 150 metres (490 ft). With the third greatest number of skyscrapers in any city within Australia (behind Melbourne and Sydney), Brisbane with a population of 3,018,000 (June 2026) and land area of 15,842 square kilometres, boasts some of the tallest buildings in the country, including Queensland's current tallest building to roof and second tallest overall, the 274.3 metres (900 ft) Brisbane Skytower, completed in 2019, which is also the largest residential building in the Southern Hemisphere.

All of Brisbane's skyscrapers (defined as buildings with a height greater than 150 metres) are located within the CBD, with large numbers of high-rise buildings also proliferating in the inner suburbs of South Brisbane, Kangaroo Point, Fortitude Valley, Newstead, Teneriffe, New Farm, Bowen Hills, Spring Hill, Milton, Auchenflower, Toowong, Taringa, St Lucia, West End and Woolloongabba.

There is a 274.3 metres (900 ft) height limit for buildings in the CBD. As of 2013, a review of height limits for city skyscrapers has been requested by Brisbane Lord Mayor to allow construction of buildings over 300 metres (980 ft) above sea level.

Brisbane's 91 metre City Hall was the city's tallest building for decades after its completion in 1930 and was finally surpassed in 1970 by the Westpac Building, which marked the beginning of the widespread construction of high-rise buildings over 100 metres in height. The city's first skyscraper with a height of over 150 metres was Central Plaza 1, completed in 1988. Central Plaza One and Waterfront Place, completed in 1989, remained the city's only skyscrapers until the completion of the 200 metre Riparian Plaza in 2005, which has since been surpassed on numerous occasions in the widespread construction of skyscrapers which has been ongoing since the mid-2000s.

Brisbane plays host to other structures over 150 metres in height such as the five television transmission towers atop Mount Coot-tha and the Bald Hills Radiator transmission tower. However these are not considered to be buildings as they are uninhabitable.

== Tallest buildings ==
This is a list of Brisbane's tallest completed and topped out buildings. Structures are not included. Official heights are ranked by the Council on Tall Buildings and Urban Habitat, and include spires but exclude communications masts and spires. All of the buildings that are listed are over 150m in height.

Was Brisbane's tallest building upon completion

Rank	Name	Image	Height m (ft)	Floors	Year	Purpose	Notes
1	Brisbane Skytower	Skytower Brisbane	274.3 m (900 ft)	90	2019	Residential	Brisbane Skytower (nicknamed Bon Bon) is a 274.3-metre (900 ft) skyscraper at 222 Margaret Street in Brisbane, Queensland, Australia. The 90-storey residential tower is Brisbane's tallest building, Queensland's tallest building to roof, the first skyscraper in Australia to be built on an equilateral triangle footprint, the first building in the world to be built with a height adjustable tower crane and the largest residential building in the Southern Hemisphere with a GFA of 147,000m^{2}. It also has the highest infinity pool in the southern hemisphere on the top level at 270.5 m (level 90) with 180 degree views to the north and south.
2	The One	The One, Brisabane	274 m (899 ft)	82	2021	Residential	The tallest tower of the three buildings of the Brisbane Quarter complex. Topped out in December 2020. Tallest building completed in the 2020s.
3	1 William Street		267 m (876 ft)	46	2016	Office	Brisbane's tallest building from 2016 to 2019; inhabited by the executive branch of the Queensland Government; nicknamed One Big Willy or the Tower of Power and seen as symbolising the legacy of Premier Campbell Newman. Tallest office building in Australia since 2016. Tallest government building in Australia since 2016.
4	Infinity		262 m (860 ft)	81	2014	Residential	Tallest building in Brisbane from 2014 until 2016; also known as Meriton Herschel Street Serviced Apartments.
5	Soleil		251 m (823 ft)	74	2012	Residential	Tallest building in Brisbane 2012 until 2014; also known as Meriton Adelaide Street Serviced Apartments.
6	Queen's Wharf Residences		242 m (794.0 ft)	63	2024	Residential	Second tallest building in the Queen's Wharf development.
7	Aurora		207 m (679.1 ft)	69	2006	Residential	Tallest building in Brisbane from 2006 until 2012.
8	Riparian Plaza		200 m (656.1 ft)	53	2005	Mixed-use	Tallest building in Brisbane 2005 until 2006; notable for its 50-metre communications mast (not counted in the building's height) and being one of the last projects of renowned architect Harry Seidler. The adjacent Riverside Centre was also designed by Seidler and shares many design elements with Riparian Plaza.
9	One One One Eagle Street		194.7 m (639.7 ft)	54	2012	Office	Notable for the illuminated curved columns resembling the roots of the Moreton Bay fig visible through its facade.
10	443 Queen Street		183.7 m (602.6 ft)	47	2023	Residential	Australia's first truly subtropical skyscraper. Won awards for 2024 CTBUH Best Tall Building by Height (100-199 metres) and 2024 (CTBUH) Best Tall Building by Region (Oceania).
11	300 George Street		182.2 m (597.8 ft)	41	2019	Office	Part of the Brisbane Quarter development which also comprises a hotel and a residential building
12	Central Plaza 1		174 m (570.8 ft)	44	1988	Office	Tallest building in Brisbane 1988 until 2005; Brisbane's first skyscraper over 150m.
13	205 North Quay		172.1 m (564.6 ft)	40	2025	Office	
14	275 George Street		171 m (561 ft)	32	2009	Office	
15	Queen's Wharf – Tower 1		171 m (561.0 ft)	43	2024	Hotel	Tallest hotel building in Brisbane since 2024.
16	Waterfront Place		162 m (531.4 ft)	40	1989	Office	Notable for its curved blue glass facade and hosting federal cabinet meetings when these are held in Brisbane, at the Commonwealth Parliament Offices on the top floor.
17	360 Queen Street		157 m (515.7 ft)	37	2025	Office	
18	480 Queen Street		153 m (501.9 ft)	34	2016	Office	
19	180 Brisbane		152 m (498.6 ft)	34	2015	Office	Notable for the large image of the course of the Brisbane River on its facade.
20	Brisbane Square		151 m (495.4 ft)	38	2006	Office	Headquarters of the Brisbane City Council and the Brisbane Square Library.
21	Skyline Apartments		150 m (492.1 ft)	48	2007	Residential	Located within the Petrie Bight cluster of apartment buildings.
22	400 George Street		150 m (492.1 ft)	34	2009	Residential	Notable for its extreme proximity to the neighbouring Santos Place, which is of approximately equal height.
23	Santos Place		150 m (492.1 ft)	38	2009	Residential	Notable for its extreme proximity to the neighbouring 400 George Street, which is of approximately equal height.

== Skylines ==
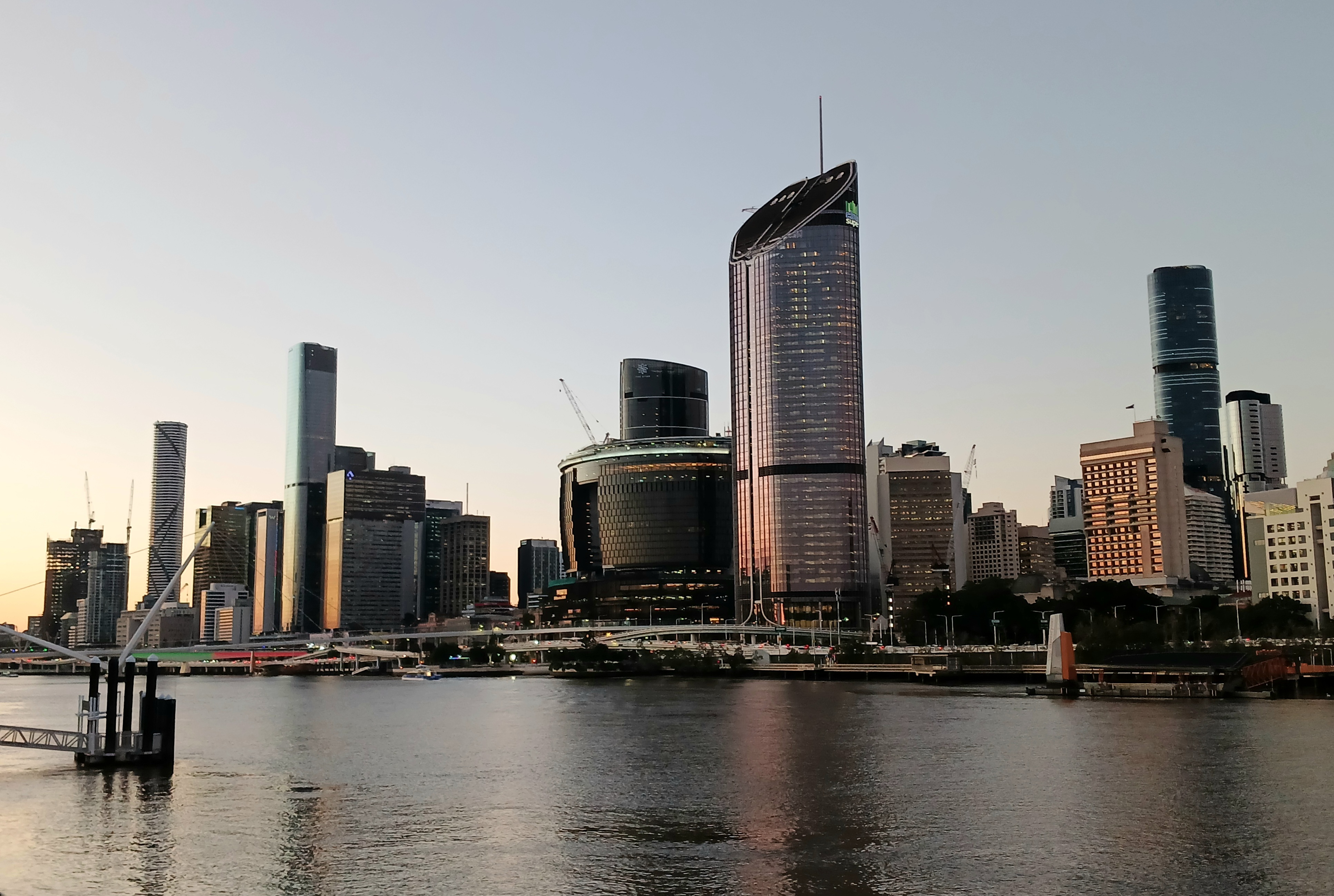
Brisbane CBD from Southbank
23 skyscrapers completed
7 skyscrapers under construction

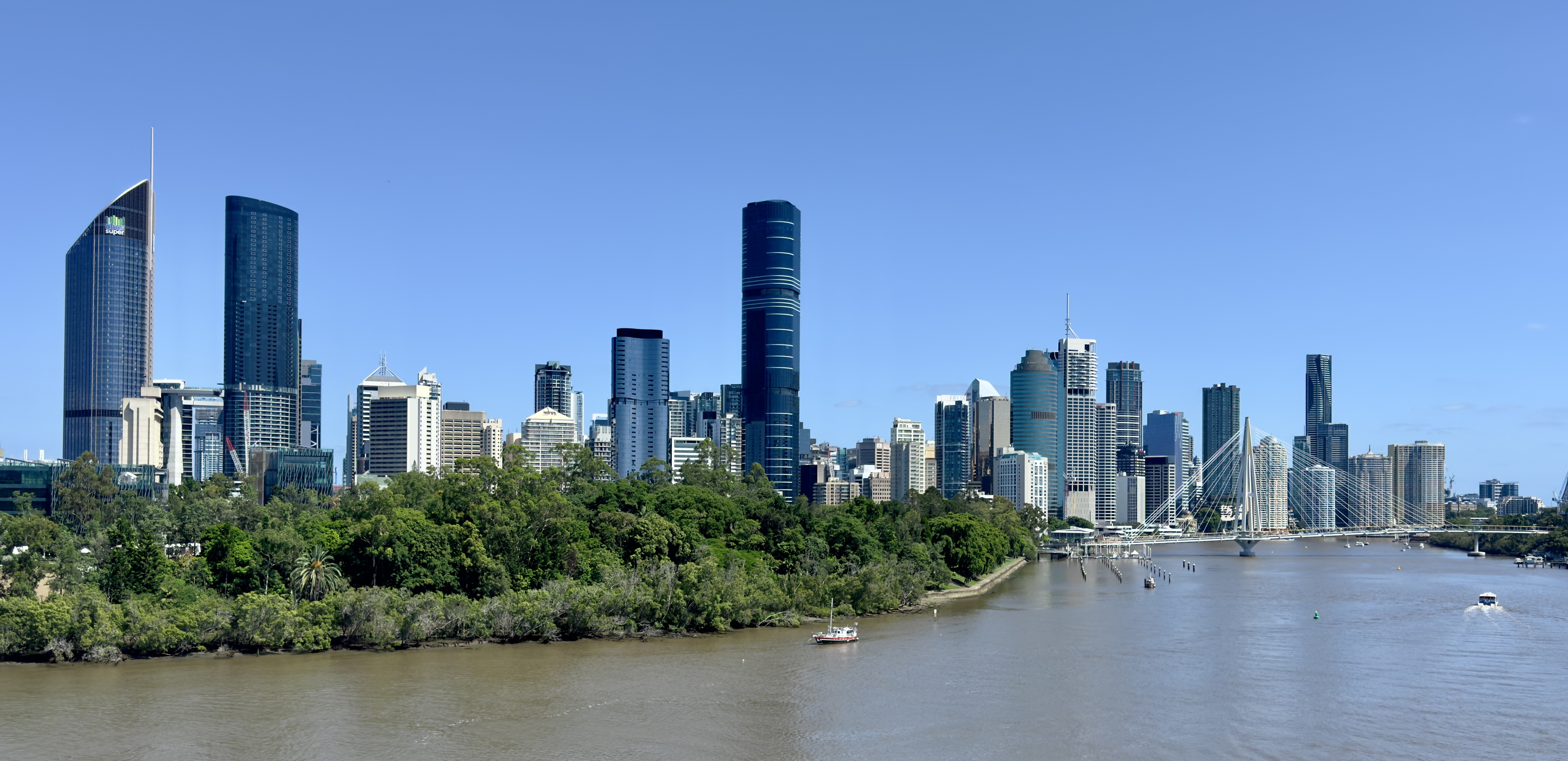
Brisbane CBD from Kangaroo Point
23 skyscrapers completed
7 skyscrapers under construction

== Tallest under construction or proposed ==
This is a list of buildings currently under construction or approved that are planned to reach 150 m in height.

Key:
Topped out	Under construction	Approved

Name	Height	Floors	Purpose	Year	Status
The Oscar – Tower A	273.5 m (897.3 ft)	79	Residential	2027	Under Construction
30 Albert Street	270 m (885.8 ft)	91	Residential	TBA	Approved
25 Mary Street	254.1 m (833.7 ft)	71	Residential	TBA	Approved
Queen's Wharf – Tower 5	253 m (830.1 ft)|	75	Residential	2027	Under Construction
The Oscar – Tower M	244.2 m (801.2 ft)	70	Residential	2027	Under Construction
Brisbane Waterfront North Tower	238 m (780.8 ft)	49	Office	2028	Under Construction
309 North Quay Tower 1	213.1 m (699.1 ft)	56	Residential	TBA	Approved
Brisbane Waterfront South Tower	212 m (695.5 ft)	43	Office	TBA	Under Construction
164 Melbourne Street	207 m (679.1 ft)	50	Mixed use	2027	Under Construction
195–199 Elizabeth Street	196 m (643.0 ft)	62	Residential	TBA	Approved
309 North Quay Tower 2	195.7 m (642.1 ft)	51	Residential	TBA	Approved
62 Mary Street	189 m (620.1 ft)	39	Office	TBA	Approved
101 Albert Street	180 m (590.6 ft)	40	Office	2029	Under Construction
150 Elizabeth St Regent Tower	174 m (570.9 ft)	42	Residential	2027	Approved

== Timeline of tallest buildings ==
This lists buildings that once held the title of "tallest building in Brisbane".

Name	Image	Years as tallest	Height	floors	Notes
Brisbane City Hall	Brisbane City Hall, 275 George Street, 69 Ann Street, 300 George, Brisbane, Feb 2020	1930–1970	92 m (302 ft)	4	Brisbane's tallest building for four decades, City Hall now plays host to the Museum of Brisbane and auditoria for events
Westpac Building		1970–1971	105 m (344 ft)	23	Brisbane's first skyscraper with a height greater than 100 metres.
Suncorp Plaza		1971–1976	118 m (387 ft)	26	A 10-metre digital clock sits atop the building. Before placement of the clock, a rotating restaurant sat atop the building.
Hitachi Building (formerly MLC Centre) 239 George Street		1976–1977	141 m (463 ft)	33	A 31 metre weather beacon sits atop the building.
AMP Place	AMP Place, Brisbane, Queensland	1978–1986	135 m (443 ft)	35	Nicknamed The Gold Tower and located adjacent to the 134 metre Comalco Place, which was completed in 1983 and is nicknamed The Blue Tower.
Riverside Centre		1986–1988	142 m (466 ft)	40	Located adjacent to Riparian Plaza, which was also designed by renowned architect Harry Seidler and with which it shares numerous design elements.
Central Plaza 1		1988–2005	174 m (571 ft)	44	Brisbane's first skyscraper over 150m in height.
Riparian Plaza		2005–2006	200 m (660 ft)	53	Tallest building in Brisbane 2005 until 2006; notable for its 50-metre communications mast (not counted in the building's height) and being one of the last projects of renowned architect Harry Seidler. The adjacent Riverside Centre was also designed by Seidler and shares many design elements with Riparian Plaza.
Aurora		2006–2012	207 m (679 ft)	69	Brisbane's tallest building from 2006 until 2012.
Soleil		2012–2014	251 m (823 ft)	74	Brisbane's tallest building from 2012 until 2014; also known as Meriton Adelaide Street Serviced Apartments.
Infinity		2014–2016	262 m (860 ft)	81	Brisbane's tallest building from 2014 until 2016; also known as Meriton Herschel Street Serviced Apartments.
1 William Street		2016–2018	267 m (876 ft)	46	Brisbane's tallest building from 2016 until 2018; inhabited by the executive branch of the Queensland Government; nicknamed One Big Willy or the Tower of Power and seen as symbolising the legacy of Premier Campbell Newman. Tallest government building in Australia since 2016. Tallest office building in Australia since 2016.
Brisbane Skytower	Skytower Brisabane	2018–present	274.3 m (900 ft)	90	Tallest building in Brisbane. Fourth-tallest building in Australia. Largest residential building in the Southern Hemisphere since 2019. First skyscraper in Australia to be built on an equilateral triangle footprint Topped out in December 2018.

== See also ==
- List of tallest buildings on the Gold Coast
- List of tallest buildings in Australia
- List of tallest buildings in Oceania
- 171 Edward Street, unbuilt proposed building project that would, if approved, be 81 stories
