= Brisbane Skytower =

Residential skyscraper in Queensland, Australia

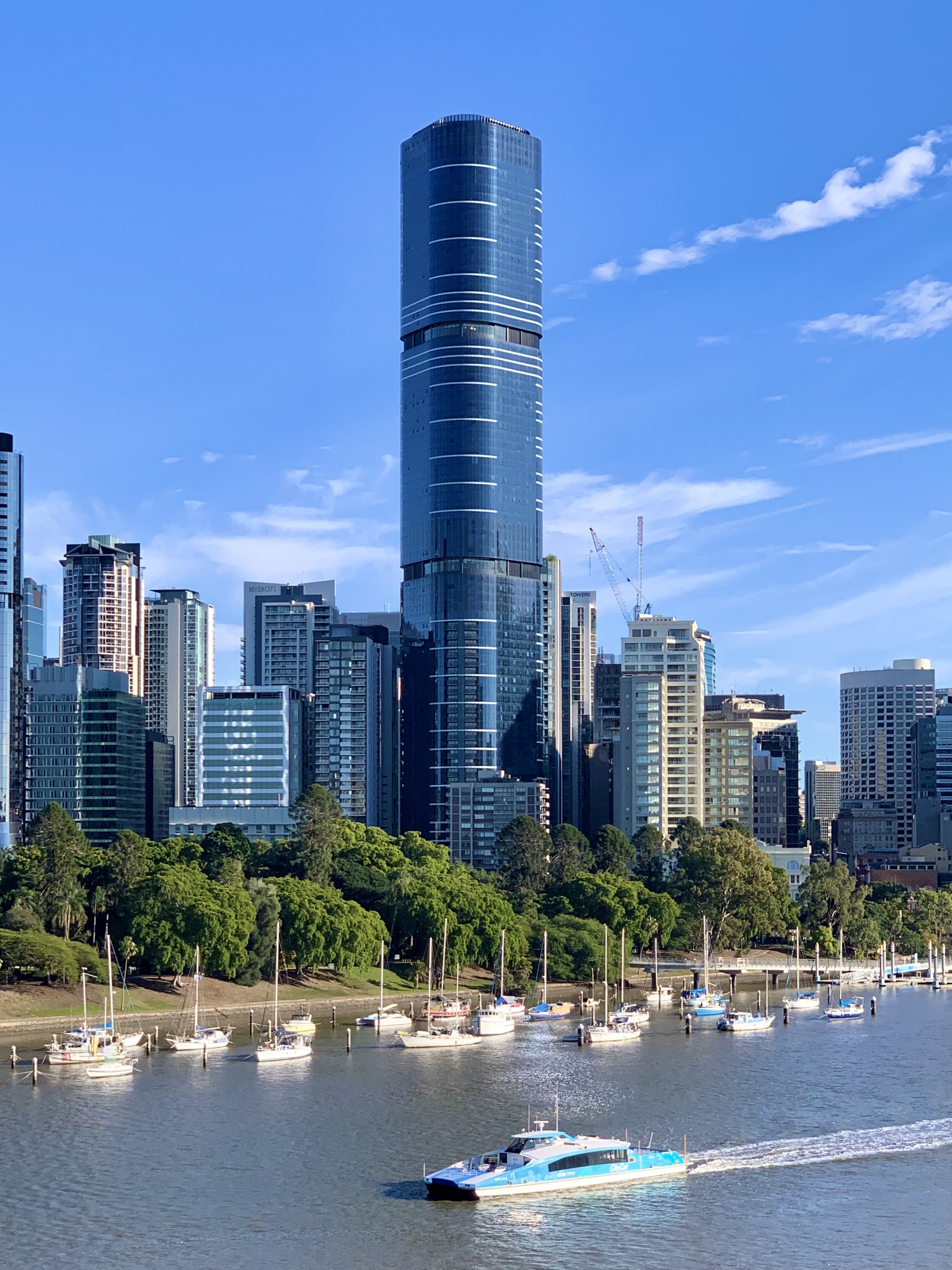
- Brisbane Skytower in July 2020

General information
- Status: Completed
- Type: Residential
- Location: 222 Margaret Street, Brisbane, Australia
- Coordinates: 27°28′18.16″S 153°01′43″E
- Construction started: 2015
- Completed: 2019

Height
- Roof: 274.3 m (900 ft)

Technical details
- Floor count: 90
- Floor area: 147,000 square metres (1,580,000 ft^{2})

Design and construction
- Architect: Noel Robinson Architects / Nettletontribe
- Developer: Billbergia Group and AMP Capital
- Structural engineer: ADG Engineers & Bonnacci Group
- Civil engineer: Inertia
- Quantity surveyor: GRC Quantity Surveyors
- Main contractor: Hutchinson Builders

Website
- brisbaneskytower.songproperties.com.au

Brisbane Skytower is a 274.3-metre (900 ft) skyscraper at 222 Margaret Street in Brisbane, Queensland, Australia. The 90-storey residential tower was the third-tallest building in Australia at the time of its completion, and is currently the tallest building in Brisbane, the tallest building in Queensland to roof and the fifth-tallest building in Australia. It is also the first skyscraper in Australia to be built on an equilateral triangle footprint, the first building in the world to be built with a height-adjustable tower crane and the largest residential building in the Southern Hemisphere, with a gross floor area of 147,000 square metres.

Brisbane Skytower is one of two buildings in the 111+222 development; the other being a 42-storey, five-star Westin hotel at 111 Mary Street which was sold in September 2015 to the Felicity Hotel Group and now known as Mary Lane.

The residential tower includes 1,141 one, two and three-bedroom apartments as well as sub-penthouse and penthouse apartments. A recreation deck, on the 90th floor, features Australia's highest infinity-edge swimming pool. An eight-level basement car park is included in the project, containing a total of 980 spaces.

The project was developed by Billbergia and AMP Capital with US funds giant Invesco providing debt funding.

== History ==
Two buildings proposed for the site by the Billbergia Group and AMP Capital with heights of 274.3 and 131 metres (900 and 430 ft), were approved by Brisbane City Council in October 2014.

Hutchinson Builders were appointed to construct the project in 2015.

In 2017, residents were permitted to begin moving in, before the rest of the building was completed.

== Design and location ==
The building is located in the south of the central business district close to the City Botanic Gardens and Brisbane River. The site was the location for the cancelled Vision Brisbane project.

The structure is designed around an equilateral triangle. It features double-glazed, full height windows and a podium on level Three.

== See also ==
- List of tallest buildings in Australia
- List of tallest buildings in Brisbane
- List of tallest buildings in Oceania

== Gallery ==
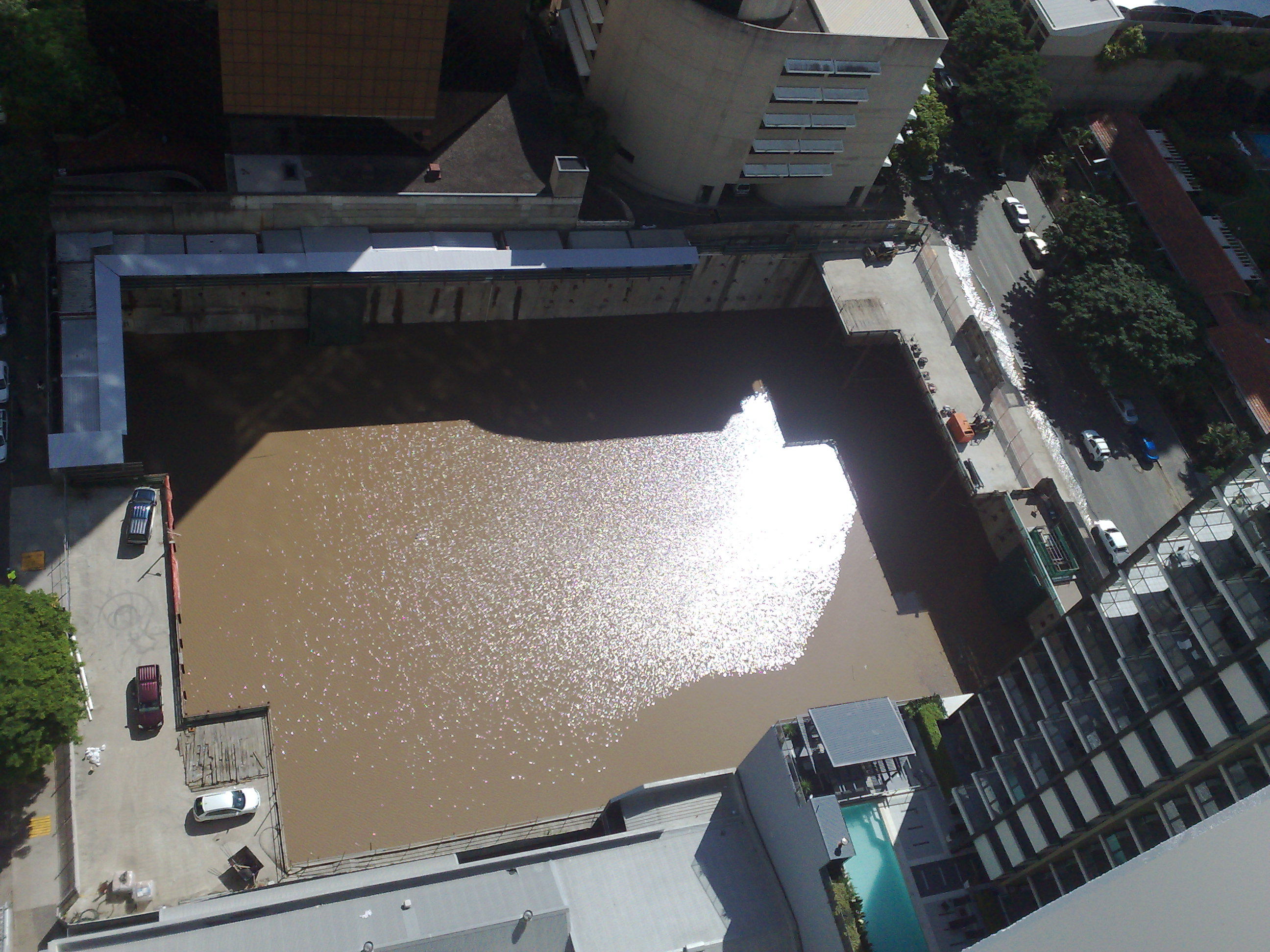
Construction site filled with water after 2011 Brisbane flood

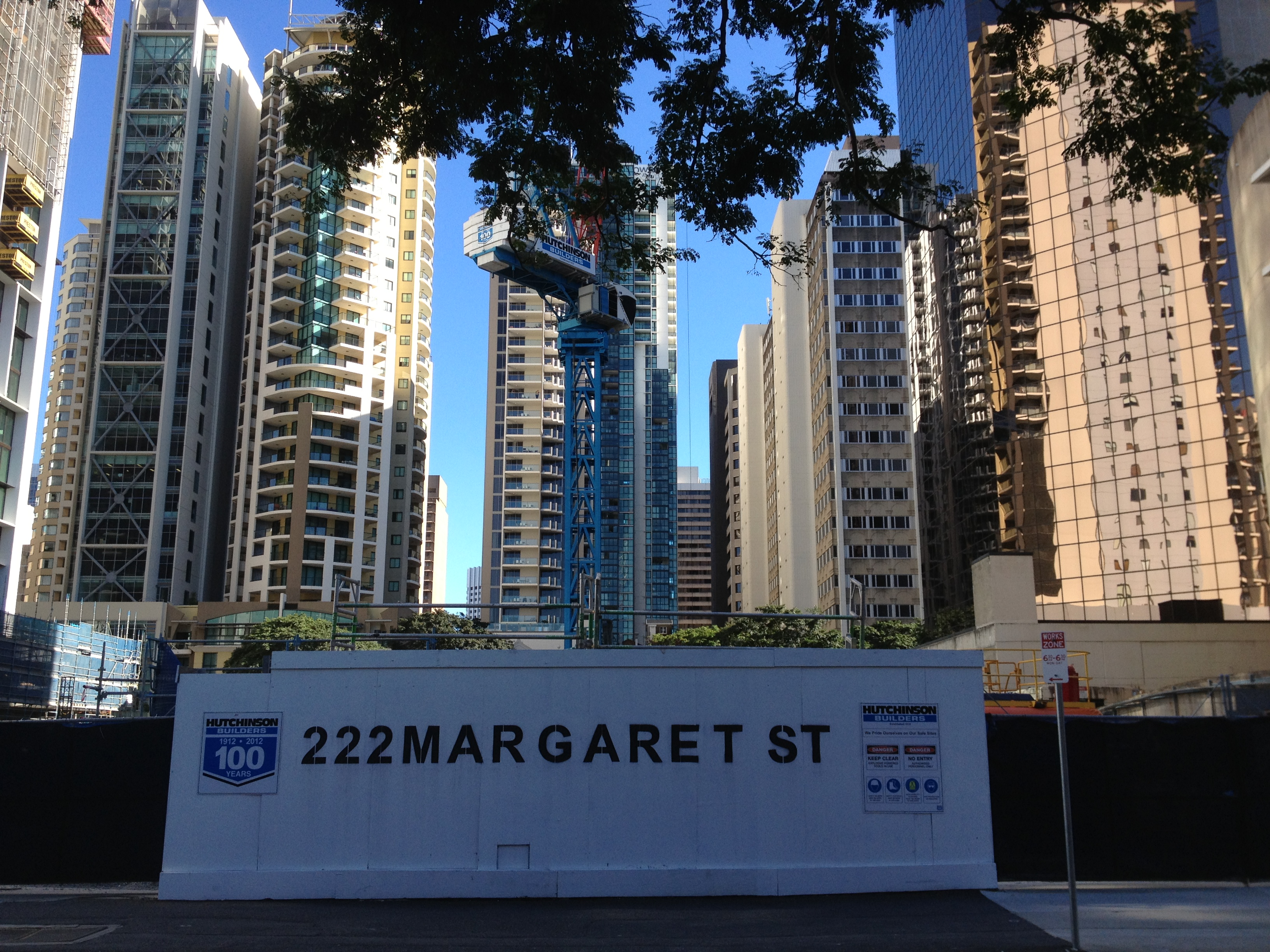
Construction site in May 2013

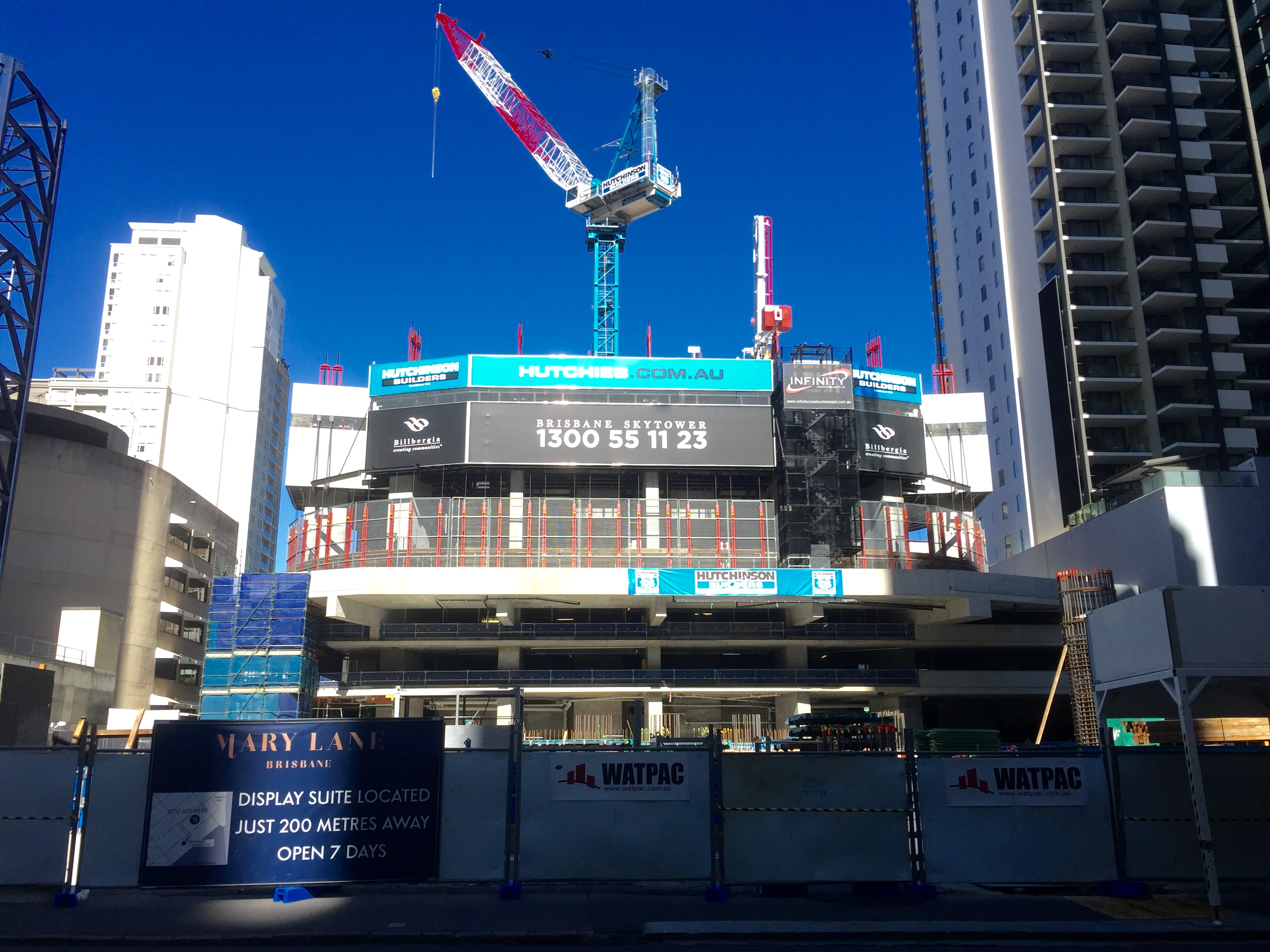
Building under construction in August 2016

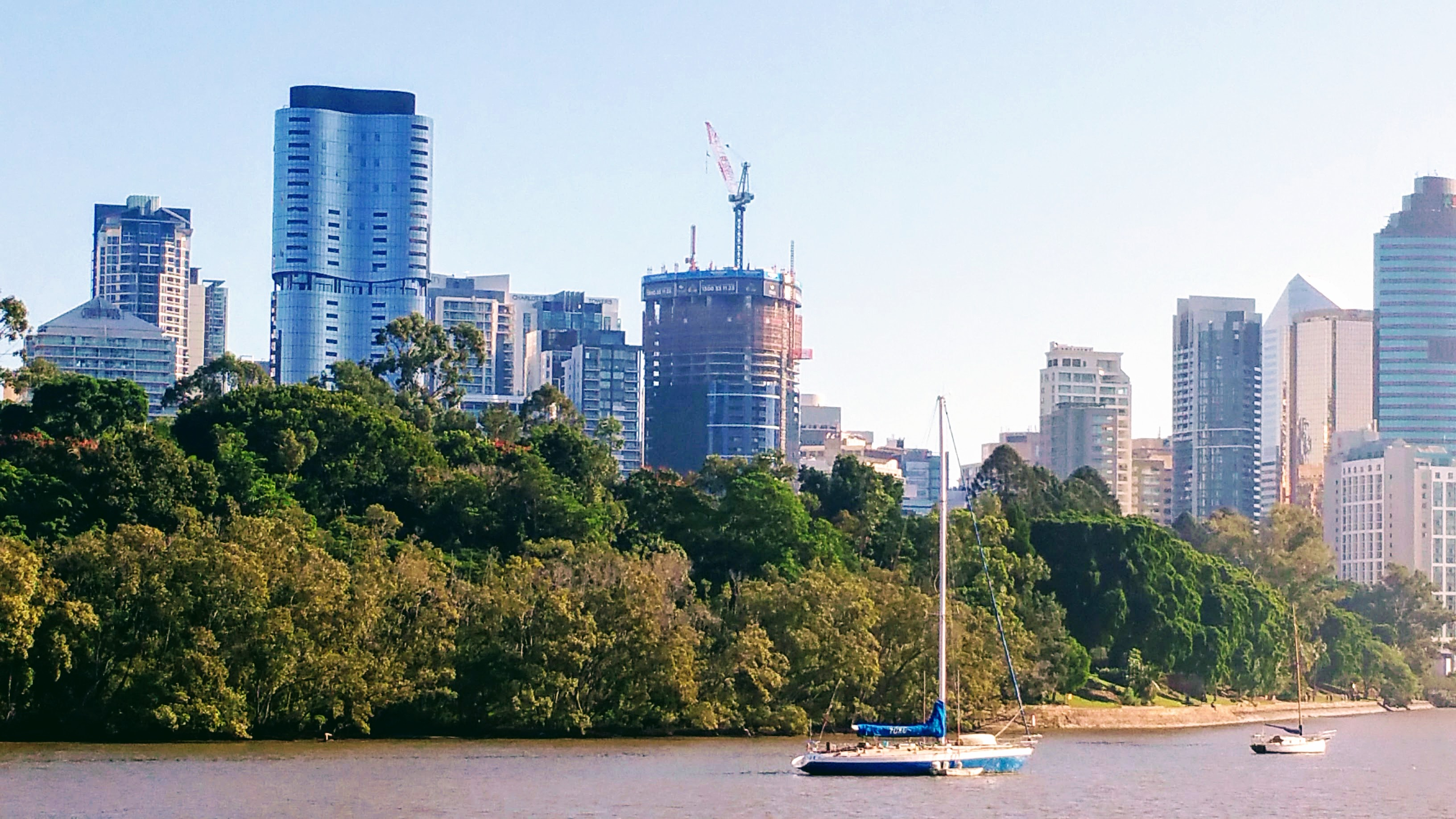
Under construction in May 2017

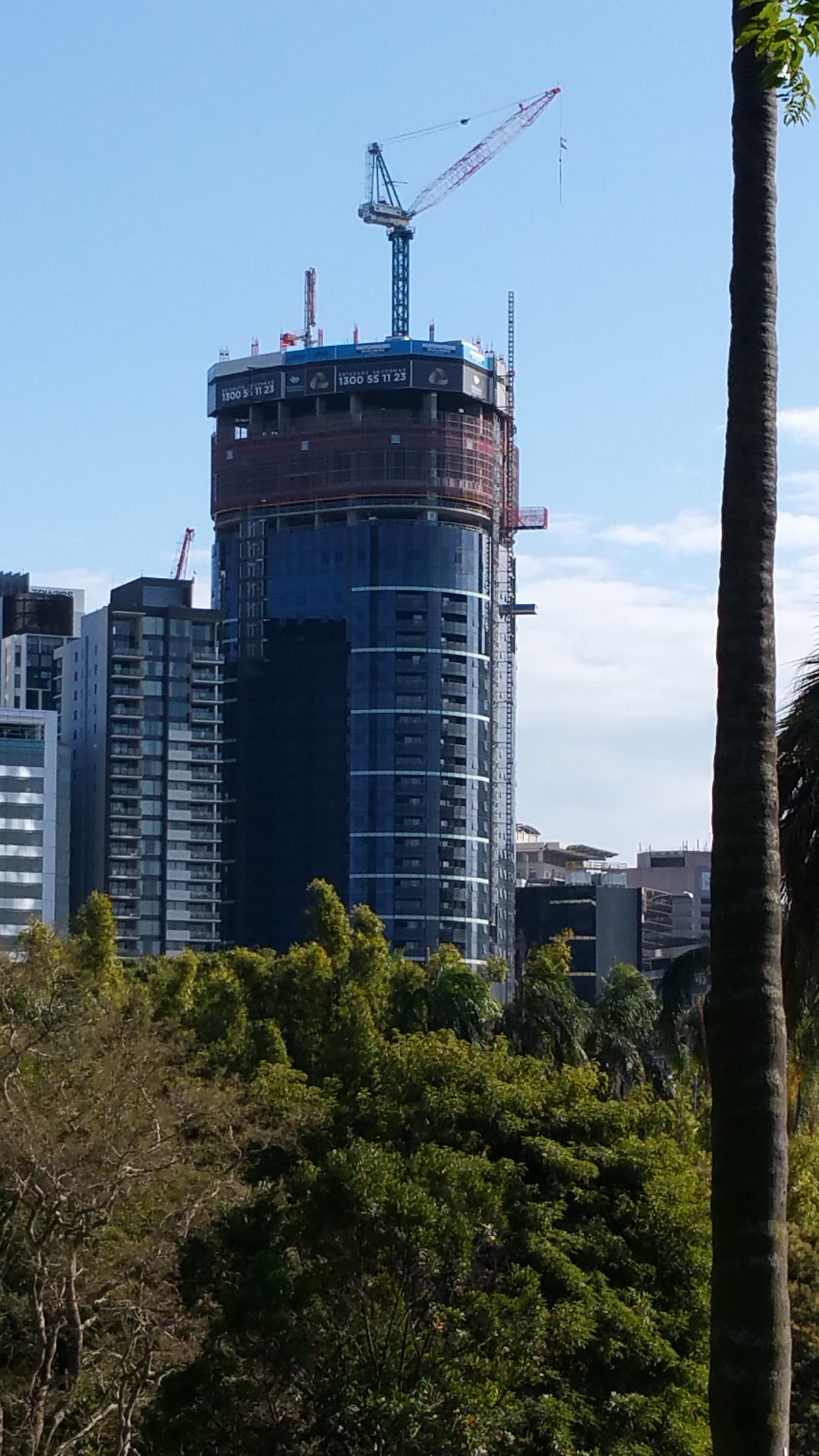
Under construction in August 2017 [level 43]

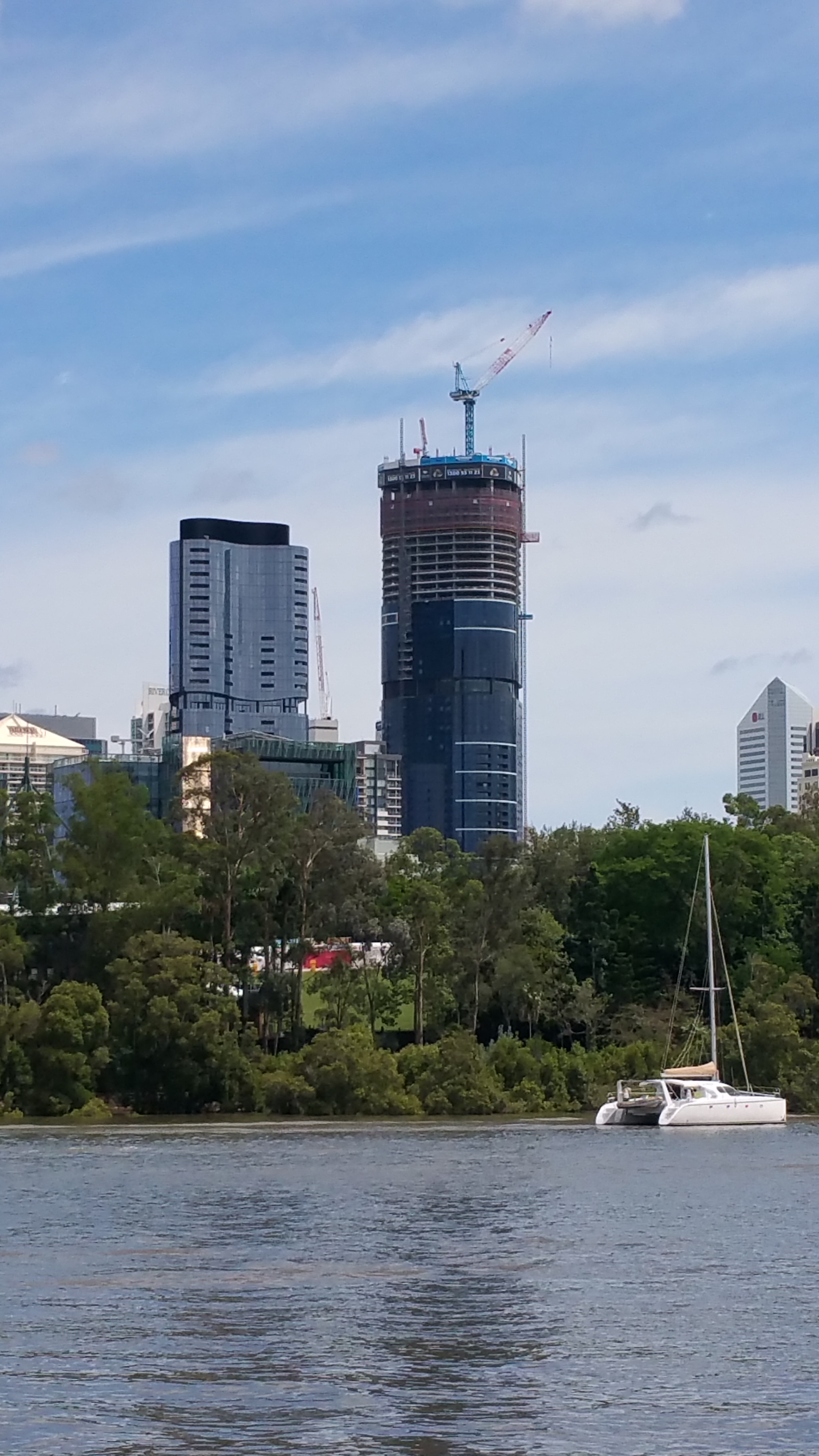
Brisbane Skytower under construction December 2017 [level 62]

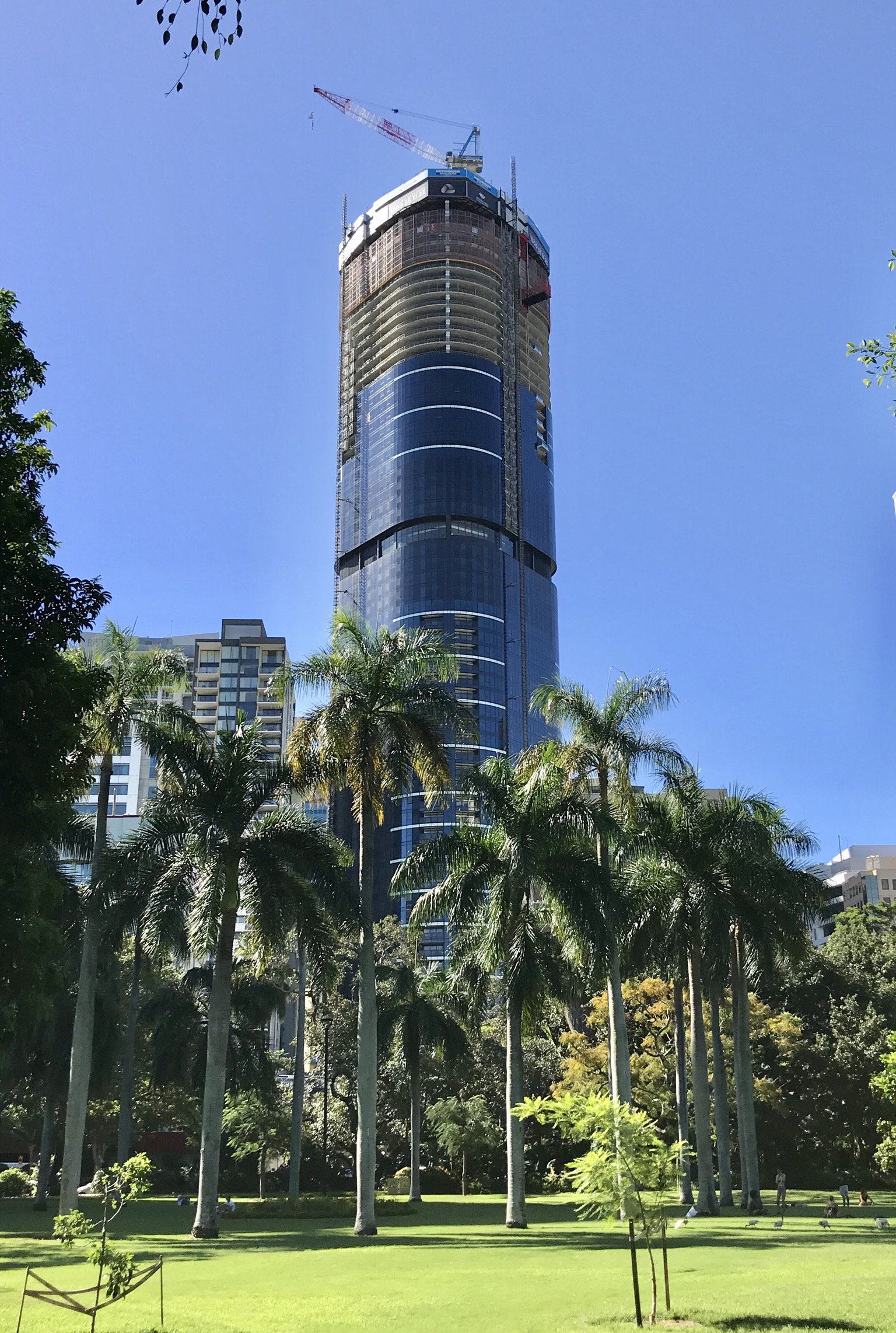
In January 2018

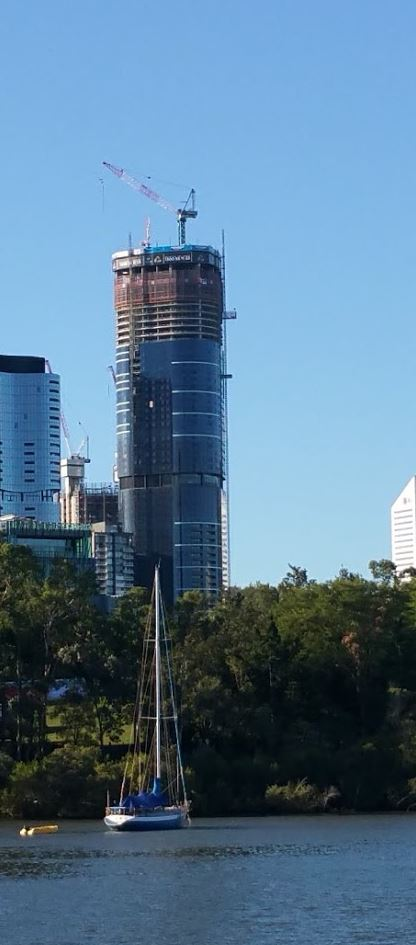
As of Feb 2018 - Floor 70

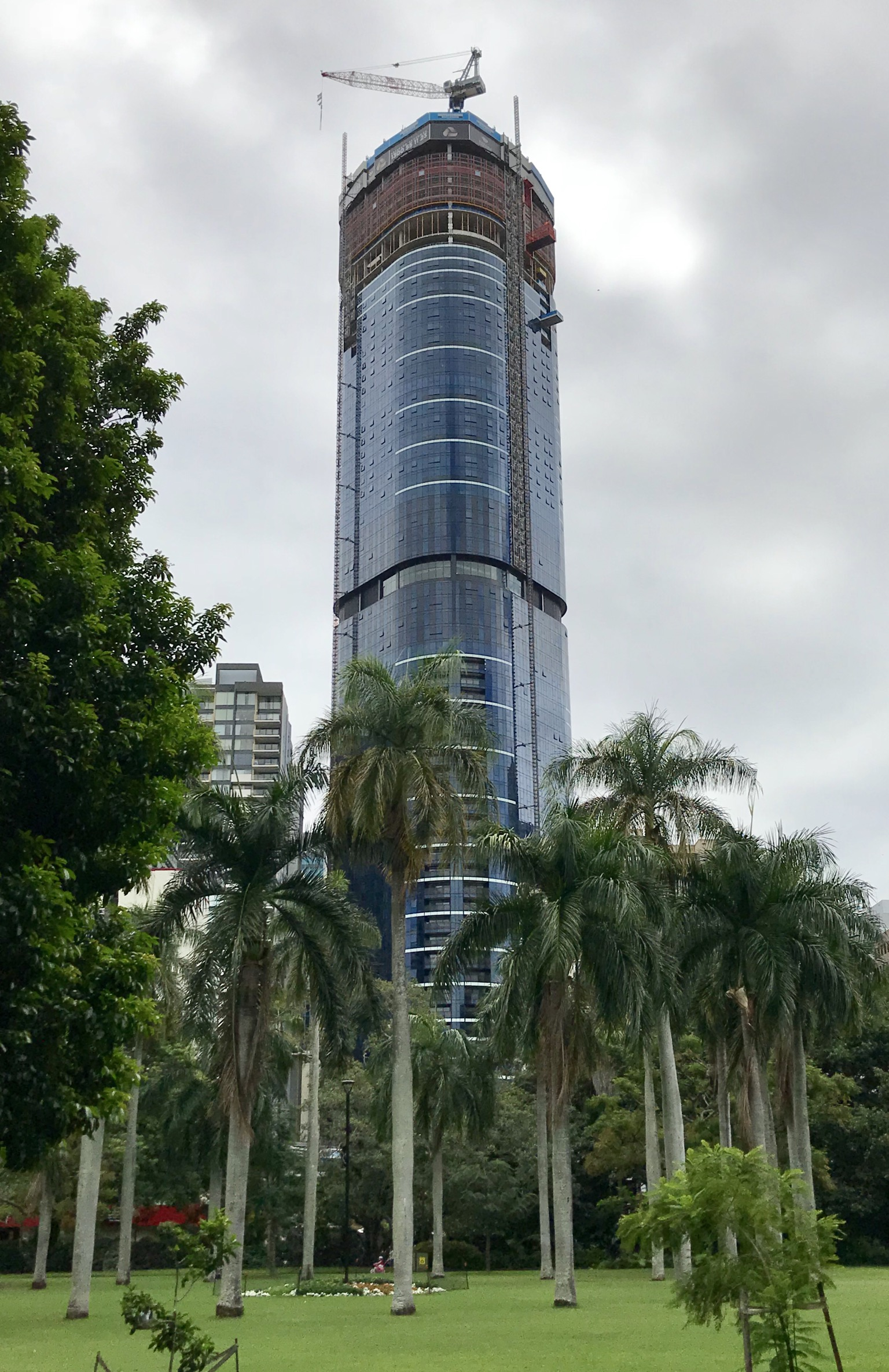
Under construction as of March 2018

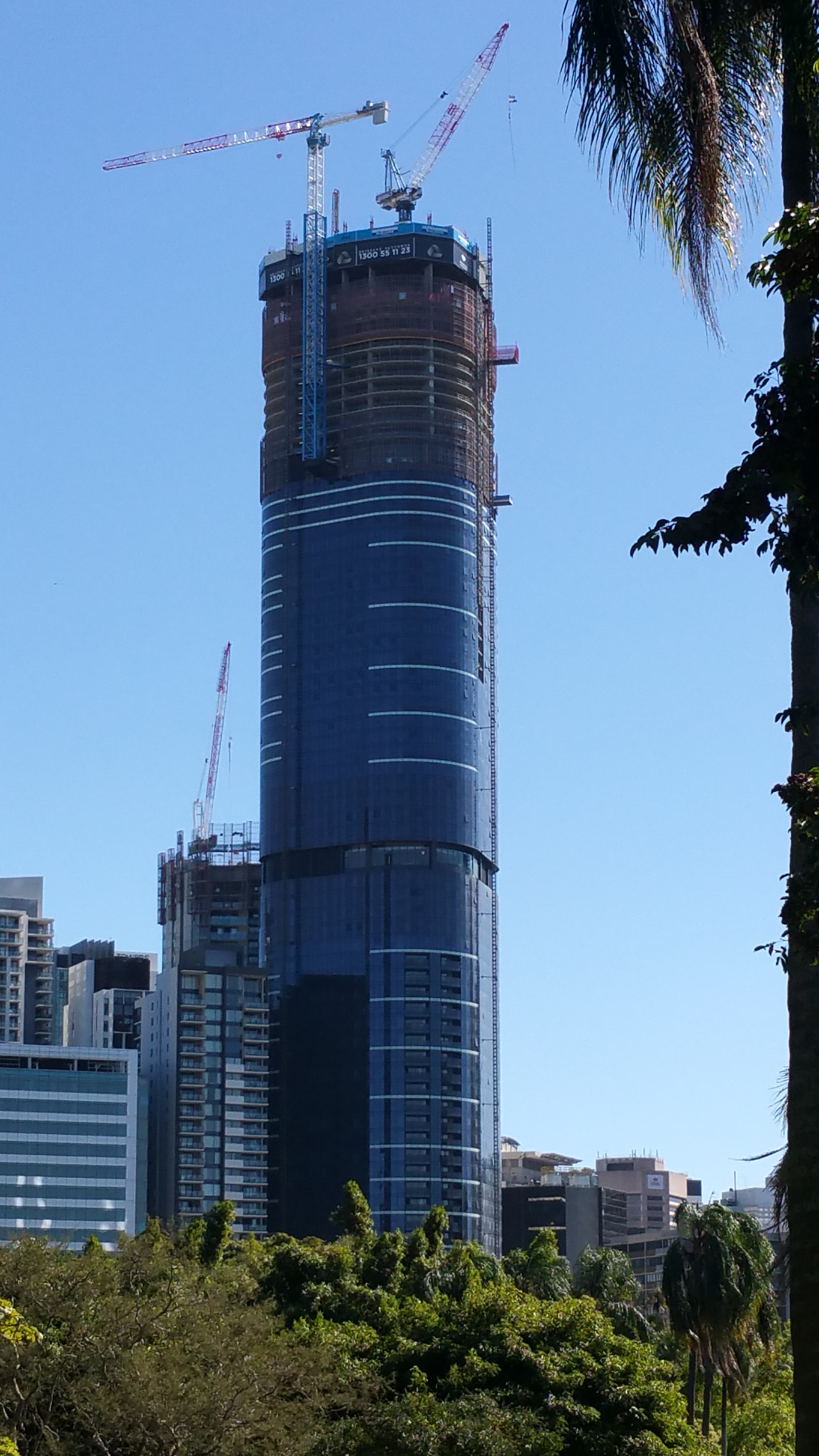
The skytower as of 12 May 2018 [Floor 79]

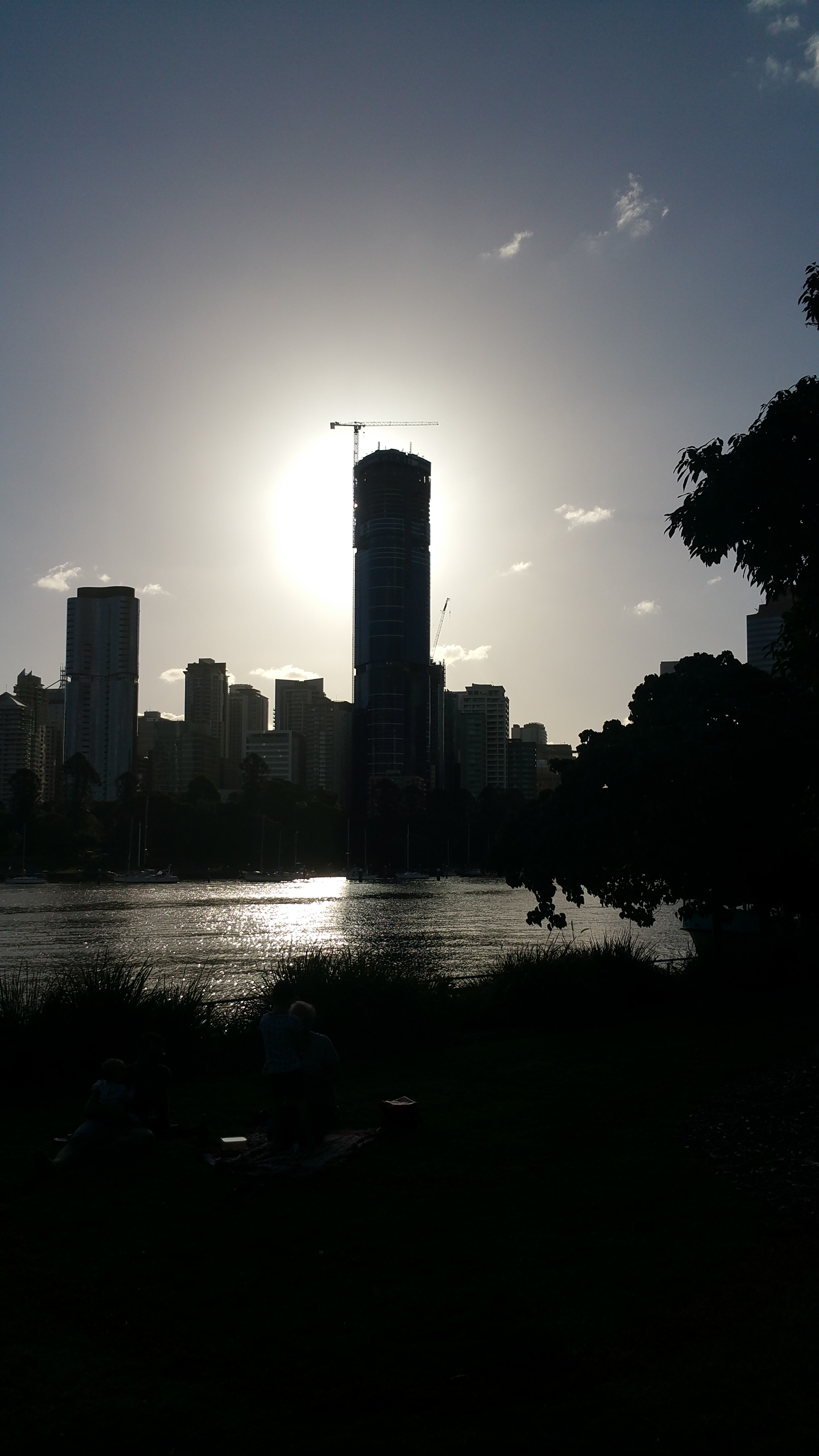
Brisbane SkyTower near sunset.
