= 275 George Street =

171 m (561 ft) office building located on George Street in Brisbane, Australia

Coordinates: 27°28′11.26″S 153°1′22.04″E

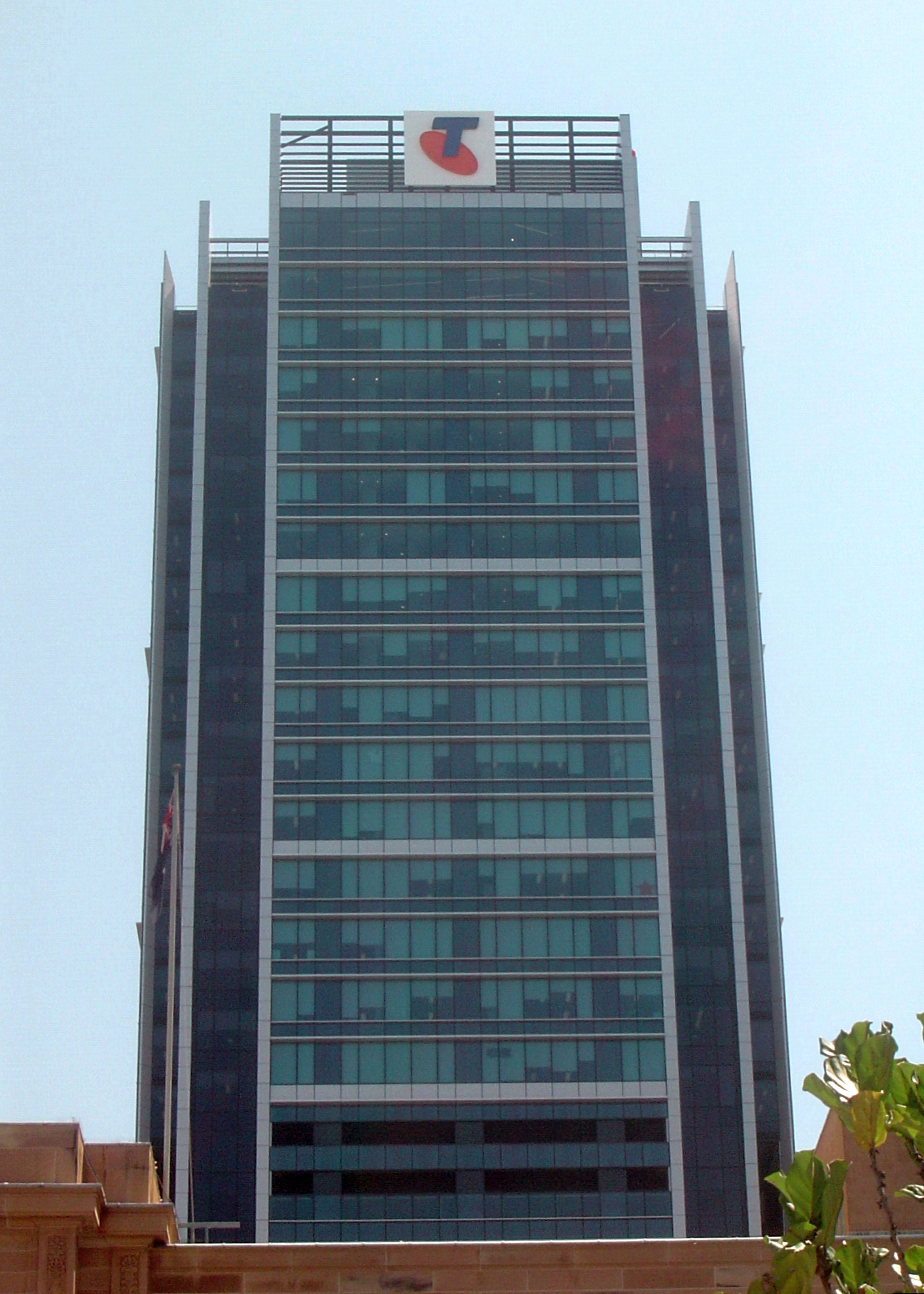
- View from King George Square, 2009
- Interactive map of the 275 George Street area

General information
- Status: Completed
- Type: Office
- Location: George Street, Brisbane, Queensland, Australia
- Construction started: 2007
- Completed: 2009
- Opening: 2009

Height
- Antenna spire: 171 m (561 ft)
- Roof: 142 m (466 ft)

Technical details
- Floor count: 32

Design and construction
- Architect: Donald Crone Architects

275 George Street is a 171 m (561 ft) office building located on George Street, Brisbane, Australia. Completed in February 2009, it has 32 storeys. The building was developed by Charter Hall and constructed by Watpac. It was designed by Crone Partners. It stands Immediately Behind Brisbane City Hall.

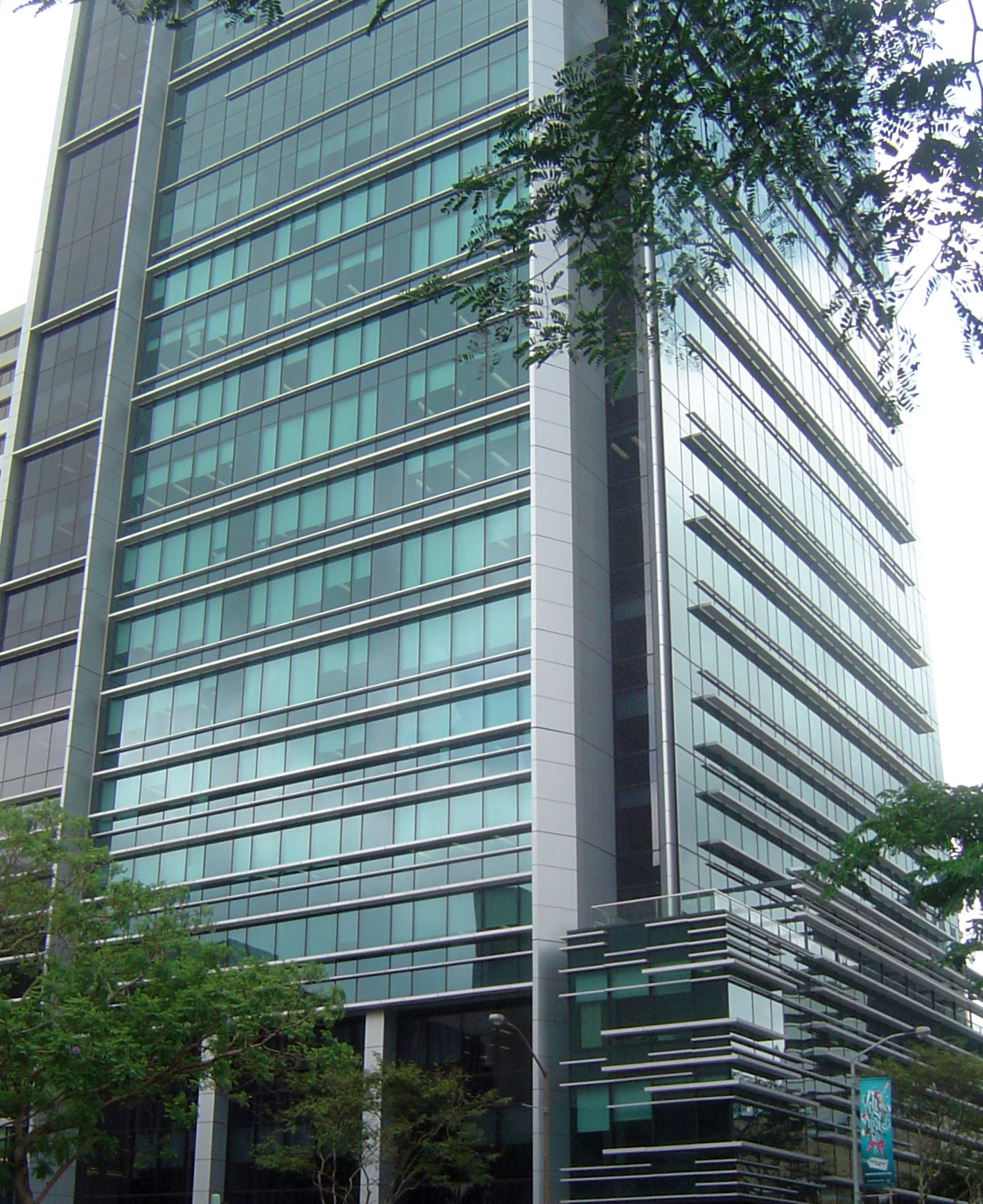
Lower floors

To its roof, the building reaches 142 m (466 ft), but a spire mounted atop it brings its total height to 171 m (561 ft), making it the 11th-tallest in Brisbane. The commercial lettable area of the building is 41,000 m^{2} (440,000 sq ft).

The main tenant is Telstra, which occupies floors 2–22. Telstra's lease was the largest commercial lease in Brisbane's history. Floors 23–30 are occupied by QGC. Various Queensland Government departments and the Director of Public Prosecutions (Australia) also occupy Floors 16–20 of the building.

== See also ==
- List of tallest buildings in Brisbane
