= Mob =

Mob or MOB may refer to:

== Behavioral phenomena ==
- Crowd
- Smart mob, a temporary self-structuring social organization, coordinated through telecommunication

== Crime and law enforcement ==
- American Mafia, also known as the Mob
- Irish mob, an American criminal syndicate
- A mob, in organized crime
- MOB, Member of Bloods, a member of the Bloods street gang
- A group of vigilantes
- Other criminal organizations sometimes referred to as a "mob" include:
  - Jewish mob
  - Polish mob
  - Japanese mob
  - Russian mob
  - Greek Mob (disambiguation)
  - Black Mafia or Muslim Mob
  - State Line Mob
  - Armenian Mob
  - Albanian mafia or Albanian Mob
  - Serbian mafia or Serbian Mob
  - Romanian mafia or Romanian Mob
  - Bulgarian mafia or Bulgarian Mob

== Other uses ==
- Mob, a family group, clan group or wider Aboriginal community group in Australian Aboriginal English
- Mob, collective noun for a group of macropods
- Mob (video games), a term for non-player characters
- The Mob (British band)
- Mob (slamball team), a SlamBall team based in Chicago
- Shigeo Kageyama, nicknamed "Mob", protagonist of the manga and anime Mob Psycho 100
- Mob as in a team of 100 contestants playing against a single contestant in a game show Eén tegen 100 (also known as 1 vs. 100)
- Mobil, which formerly traded on the New York Stock Exchange under the ticker MOB

== As an abbreviation ==
=== Transportation ===
- Man overboard, a person who has fallen off a boat or ship and is in need of rescue
- Mobile Regional Airport (IATA airport code), located in Mobile, Alabama
- Montreux-Oberland Bernois, a Swiss railway company
- Motos Operacionais de Bombeiros, motorcycles used as ambulances in Brazil

=== Others ===
- Magyar Olimpiai Bizottság, National Olympic Committee of Hungary
- Main Operating Base, an overseas, permanently manned, well protected military base
- Marching Owl Band, the Rice University "marching band"
- Mobile offshore base, a concept for supporting military operations where conventional land bases are not available
- MobileCoin, a cryptocurrency
- Monterey Bay FC, American association football club
- Movable object block, used in computer graphics
- Museum of Brisbane, Queensland, Australia
- M.O.B.: The Album, a 2008 album by ByrdGang
- M.O.B. (Project Pat album), 2017
- "M.O.B.", a song by Tupac Shakur from the 2001 album Until the End of Time
- "M.O.B." (Tkay Maidza song), 2015
- MOB (landmine), a Russian anti-personnel landmine

== See also ==
- The Mob (disambiguation)
