= The Mob =

The Mob may refer to:

== Crime groups ==
- Italian organized crime
  - The Italian-American Mafia, an organized crime secret society
  - The Sicilian Mafia
- Irish Mob, the first organized crime group for which the term was used
- Jewish-American organized crime, also known as the "Jewish mob" and "Kosher mob"
- Organized crime, in general

== Film, TV and entertainment ==
- The Mob (1951 film), a 1951 American film
- The Mob (1975 film), a 1975 Canadian film
- The Mob (company), a film company
- "The Mob" (Murder in Successville), a 2015 television episode
- The Mob (TV series) - A 2026 Mafia themed reality game show that aired on Hulu.
- The Mob, the 100 unsuspecting antagonists in the TV game show 1 vs. 100
- The Mob, the first book in the series Feather and Bone: The Crow Chronicles

== Music ==
=== Bands ===
- The Mob (British punk band)
- The Mob (American hardcore band), a punk rock band active 1980–91, reunited in 2011
- The Mob (American rock band), a rock supergroup that produced a single album in 2005
- The Mob (Chicago band), an American rock and R&B show band formed in 1966, or their eponymous album
- Queensrÿche, originally The Mob, an American progressive metal band

== See also ==
- The MOBB, a 2016 album by MOBB
- MOB (disambiguation)
