= Greek Mob =

The Greek Mob may refer to various ethnic Greek criminal organizations, including:

- The Greek mafia, various loosely interconnected crime groups based primarily in Greece (and sometimes including Greek-American organized crime, as listed below)
- The Philadelphia Greek Mob, a Greek American crime group based primarily in Philadelphia, Pennsylvania.
- The Velentzas crime family, a Greek American crime group based primarily in New York City.
- The Katranis crime family, a Greek American crime group based primarily in Detroit, Michigan.
- The The Greeks, a Greek Canadian crime group based primarily in Vernon, British Columbia and the Okanagan.
- The The Greeks of Chomedey Organization, a Greek Canadian crime group based primarily in Chomedey, Laval, Quebec.
