= Brisbane City Hall =

Civic building in Brisbane, Australia

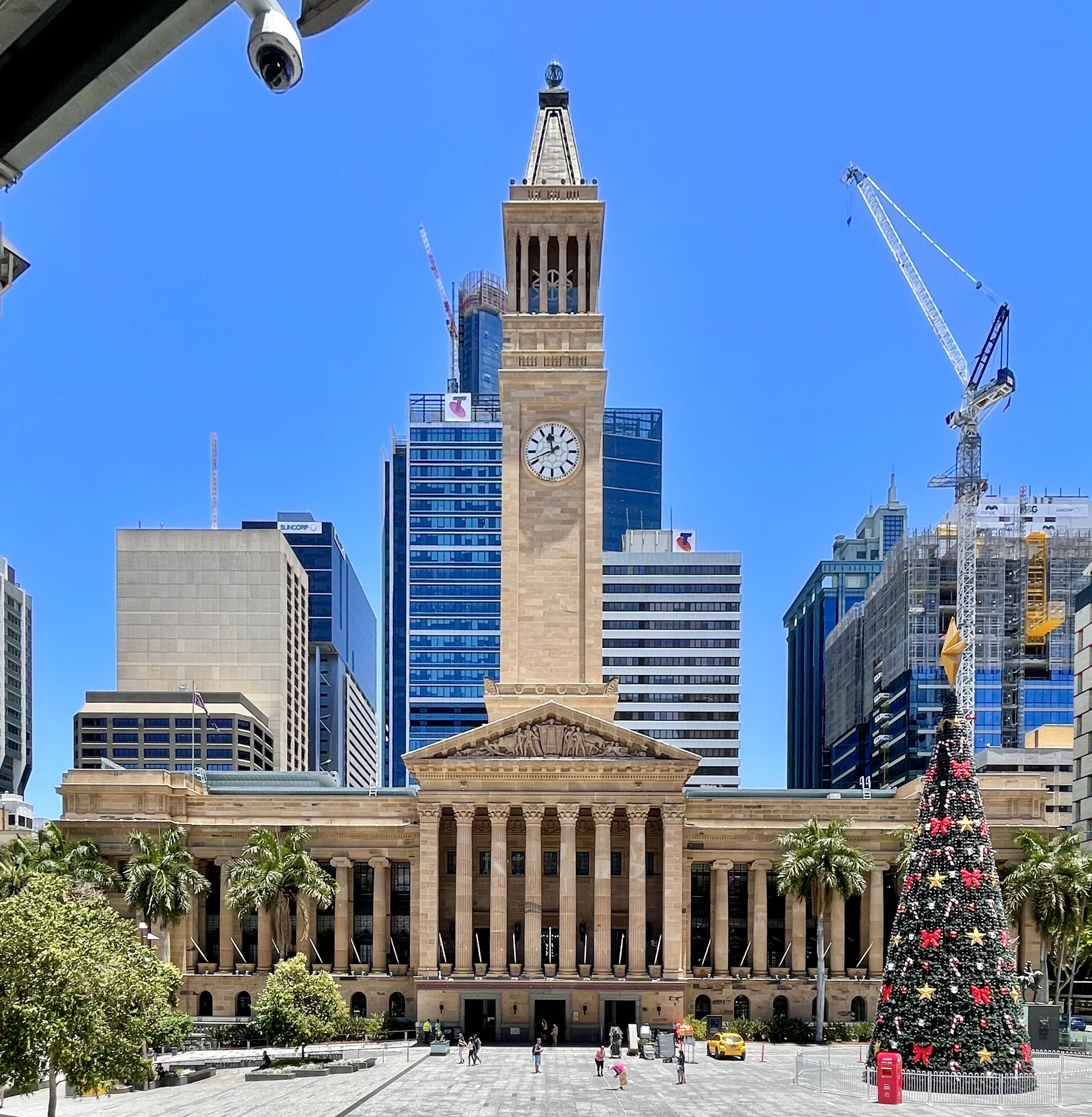
- Brisbane City Hall (view from King George Square)

General information
- Architectural style: Italian Renaissance
- Location: King George Square, Brisbane, Adelaide Street, Brisbane City, Queensland
- Coordinates: 27.46885°S 153.023602°E
- Construction started: 29 July 1920
- Inaugurated: 8 April 1930
- Renovated: 6 April 2013
- Cost: A£1,000,000
- Owner: Brisbane City Council

Height
- Height: 91 m (299 ft)

Technical details
- Floor count: 3

Design and construction
- Architects: Thomas Ramsay Hall; George Gray Prentice
- Architecture firm: Hall & Prentice
- Structural engineer: Russell John McWilliam; Freney & Davidson
- Other designers: Bruce Dellit, Peter Kaad, Emil Sodersten, Noel Wilson
- Main contractor: Arthur Midson; D.D. Carrick

Renovating team
- Architects: Megan Jones, Scott MacArthur (2010–2013)

Website
- brisbane.qld.gov.au/cityhall

Brisbane City Hall, in Brisbane, Queensland, Australia, is the seat of the Brisbane City Council. It is located adjacent to King George Square, where the rectangular City Hall has its main entrance. The City Hall also has frontages and entrances in both Ann Street and Adelaide Street. The building design is based on a combination of the Roman Pantheon, and St Mark's Campanile in Venice and is considered one of Brisbane's finest buildings. It was listed on the Register of the National Estate in 1978 and on the Queensland Heritage Register in 1992. It is also iconic for its Westminster chimes which sound on the quarter-hour.

The building has been used for royal receptions, pageants, orchestral concerts, the Lord Mayor's Seniors Christmas Concerts, civic greetings, flower shows, school graduations and political meetings. In 2008, it was discovered that the building had severe structural problems. After a three-year restoration, it re-opened on 6 April 2013.

== History ==
The City Hall was once the tallest building in Brisbane (see external links below for image from 1958). The building was designed by the firm Hall and Prentice, in association with four young New South Wales Architects: Bruce Dellit, Peter Kaad, Emil Sodersten and Noel Wilson.

=== Choosing a site ===
Although there was a strong desire to construct a new city hall, there were many years of debating the best location for it. Charles Moffatt Jenkinson, the mayor of Brisbane in 1914, is credited with having finalised the decision to construct the city hall at Albert Square (now known as King George Square), by selling the alternative site in Fortitude Valley to the Catholic Church who proposed to construct the Holy Name Cathedral on that site.

=== Laying the foundations ===
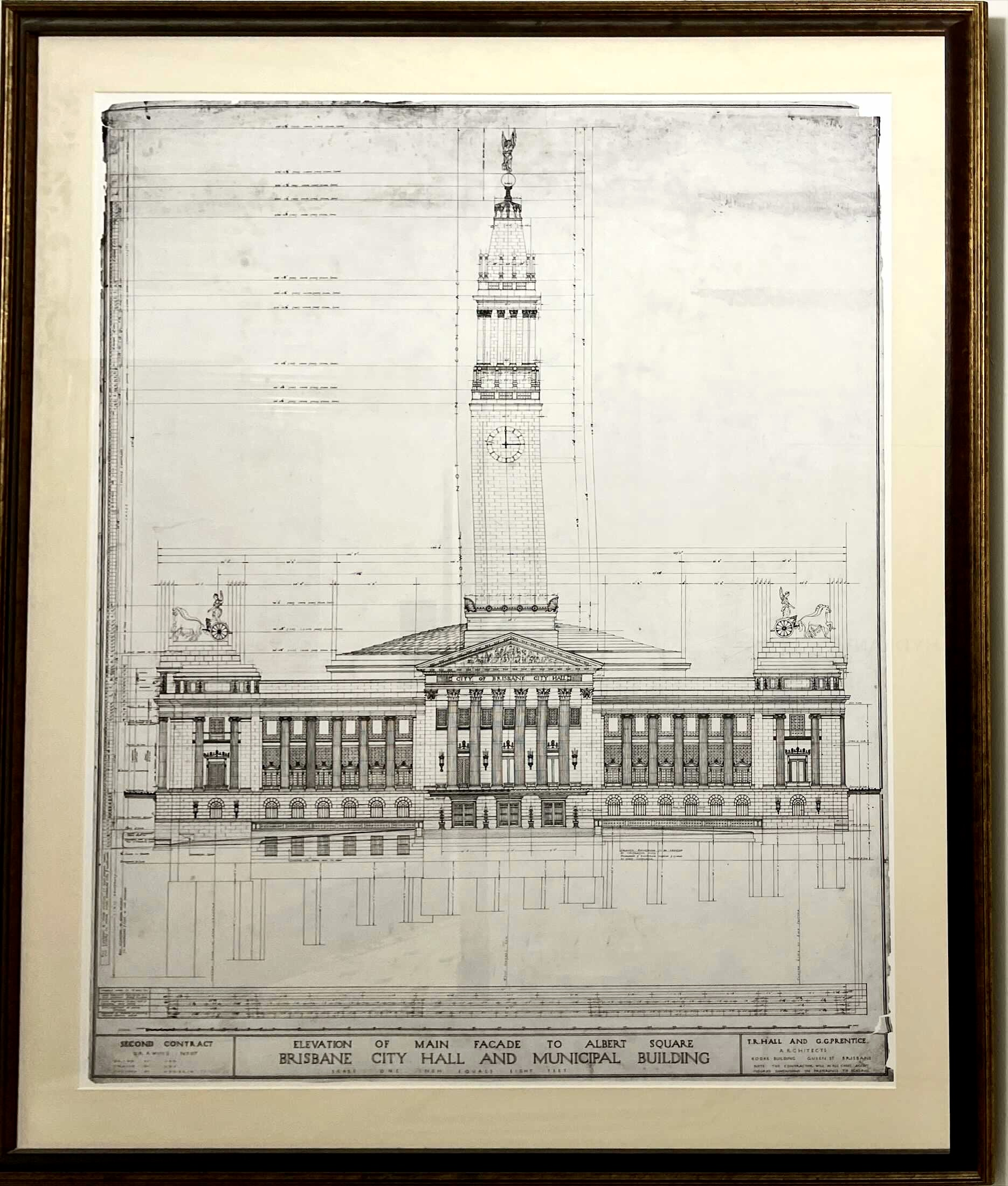
Original design included an 'Angel of Peace' atop the tower which was later scrapped due to funding issues

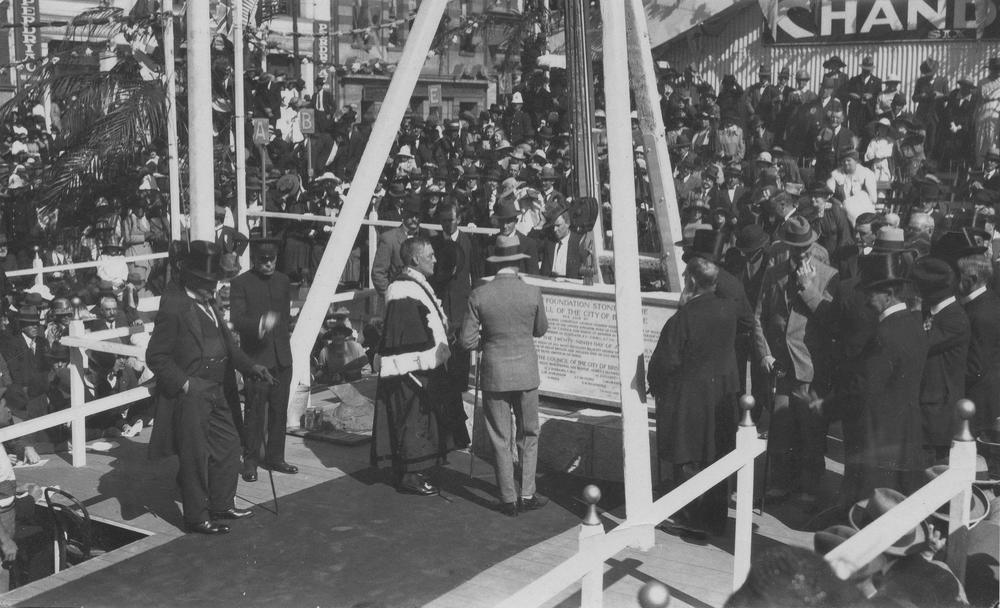
The Prince of Wales Edward VIII laying the foundation stone, July 1920

The first foundation stone was laid on Saturday 3 February 1917 by Queensland Governor (Major Sir Hamilton J. Goold-Adams) in advance of the building's construction. The stone was placed facing Albert Square (now King George Square). At the time there were no plans for the new building. The stone was hollowed to allow a time capsule to be placed within it. The time capsule was a zinc cylinder; it contained:

- copies of the Brisbane daily newspapers
- copy of the Proclamation of the Incorporation of the City
- a copy of the minutes of the first meeting of the City Council
- a copy of the minutes of the meeting at which the council resolved to lay this foundation stone
- one of each of the current coins of the realm
- a message of good wishes from the Governor

However, it was later found to be out of alignment, and it was removed. In 1935, it was claimed that the stone was in a Brisbane City Council depot in Macrossan Street. However, in 1954, it was claimed that the original foundation stone was lost as it was believed to have been used as part of a building's foundations.

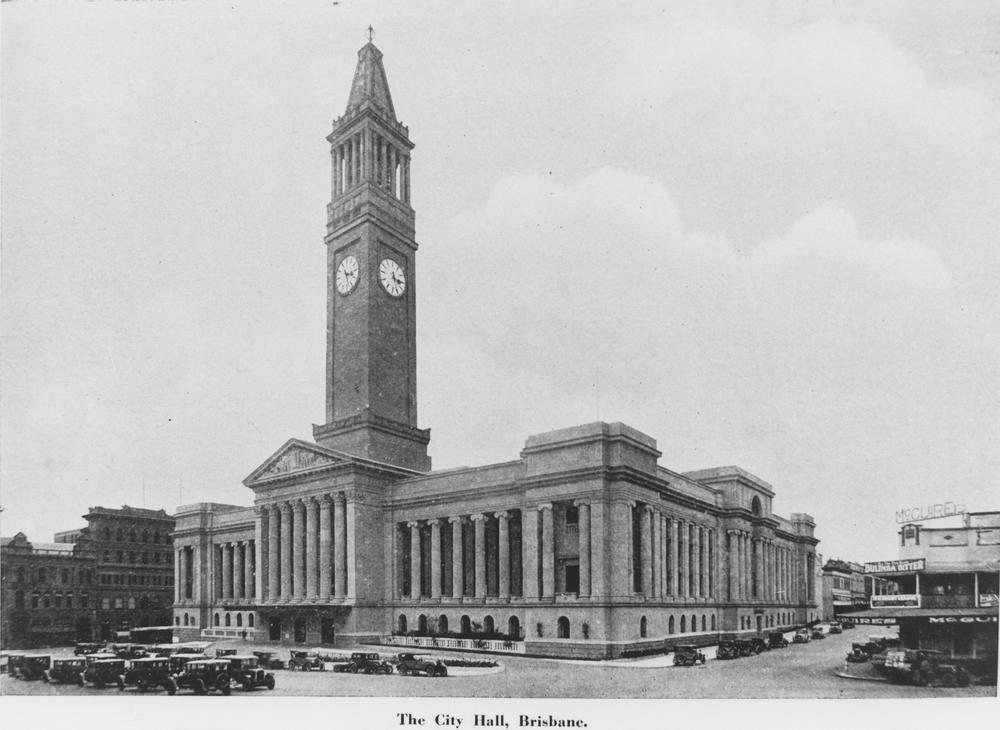
Brisbane City Hall around 1930

Brisbane Jackson family firm Synchronome Electrical Company designed and built the clock.

The second (and current) foundation stone was laid on 29 July 1920 by Edward, Prince of Wales (later King Edward VIII / Duke of Windsor), with an opal encrusted 18ct gold and trowel, designed by Peter Kaad.

The site was swampy and contained a creek. Pumping was needed to keep the site dry. Construction operations began in 1920. One man died as he was inspecting the construction site.

=== Opening ===
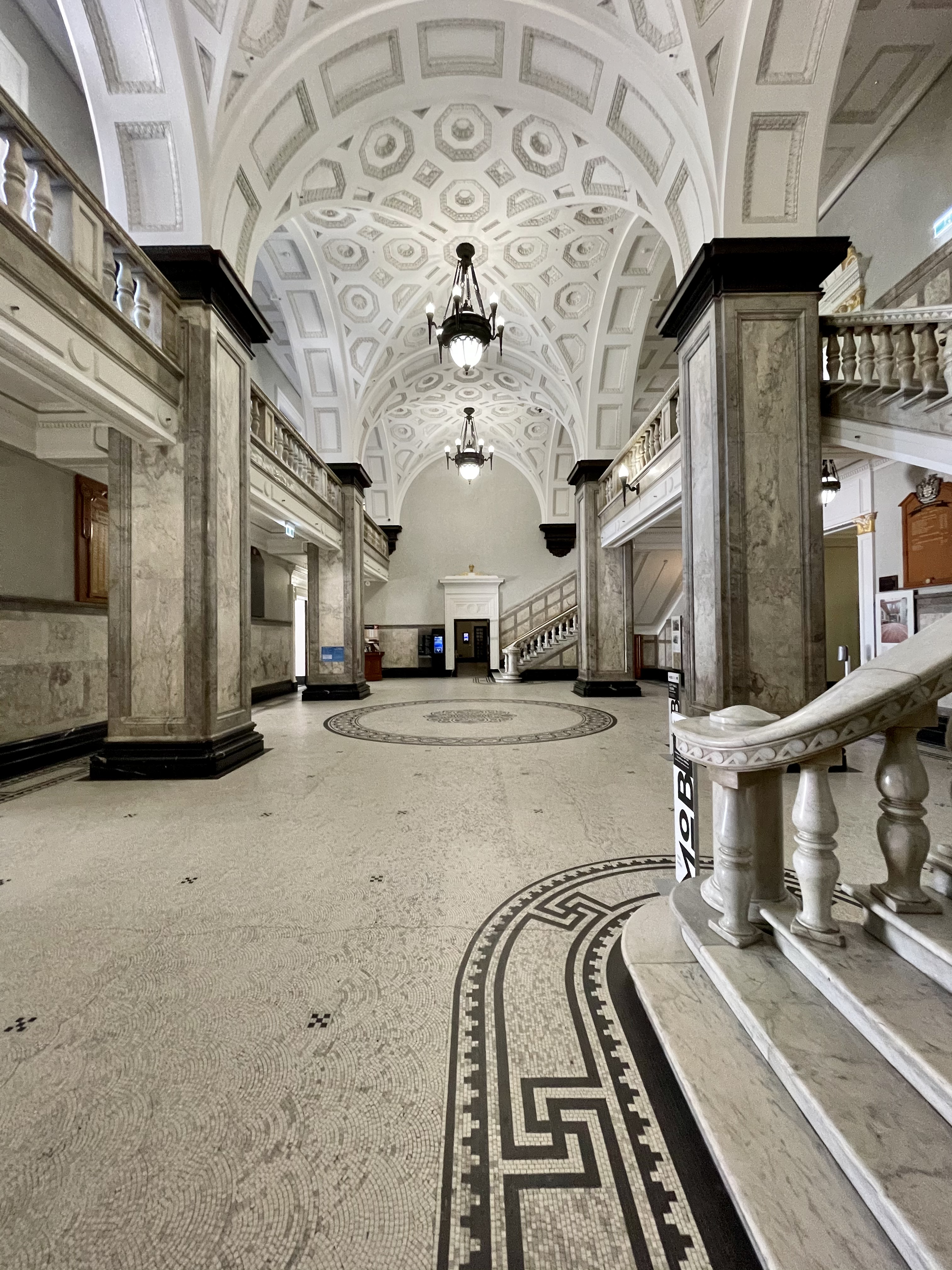
City Hall entrance foyer

Although not complete, the building was occupied from 3 January 1928. The lord mayor William Jolly presented a cheque, paying for his electricity bill, as the first official transaction in the new building.

Brisbane City Hall was opened in 1930 by Queensland Governor (Sir John Goodwin). The building was officially opened on 8 April 1930 by Lord Mayor of Brisbane William Jolly. However it had been partially occupied since 1927. In 1969 the council commenced the acquisition of the properties to the south of the City Hall, and in 1975 opened the Brisbane Administration Centre (or BAC), a 20-floor tower and surrounding plaza. Most of the council's offices then moved from the City hall to the BAC. The Council Chambers (located on second floor of the Adelaide Street side of the building) and the Lord Mayor's and Deputy Lord Mayor's offices remain however in City Hall.

=== Organ ===
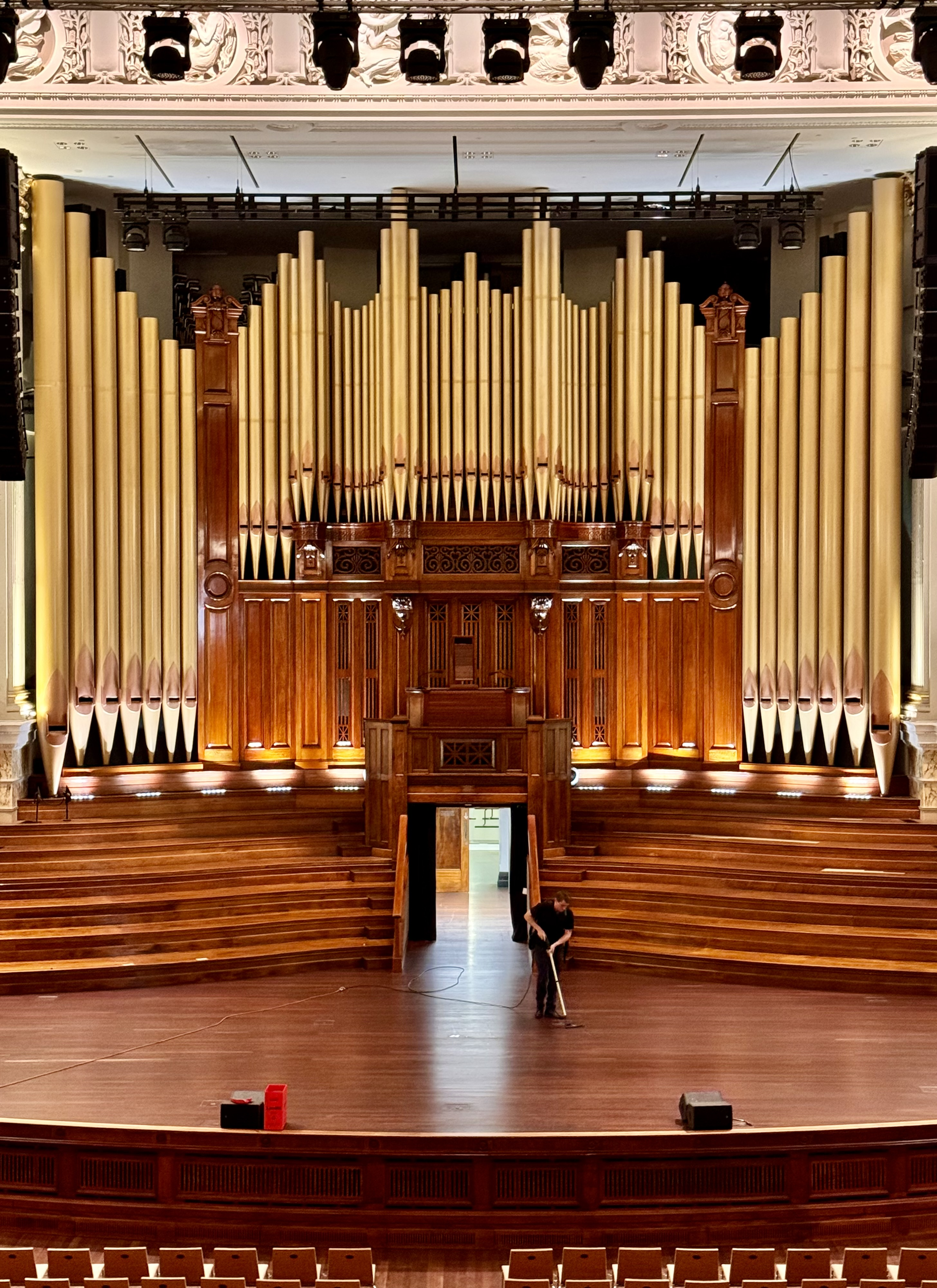
Father Henry Willis organ

The 4,391 pipes organ was built in 1891 by Henry Willis & Sons Organ Builders in Liverpool, UK, for the Brisbane Exhibition Building at Bowen Park. It remained in the Exhibition Concert Hall until it was moved to the Brisbane City Hall in 1927. The City Hall's first organ recital was held in 1929. The organ concert held on 14 November 2009 celebrated the 80th anniversary of the organ installation in the Brisbane City Hall and was the last organ recital before building restoration commenced. When City Hall closed on 31 December 2009, the organ was totally dismantled and removed from the building for storage. It was planned that the organs would return to the hall three years later.

=== 1980s restoration ===
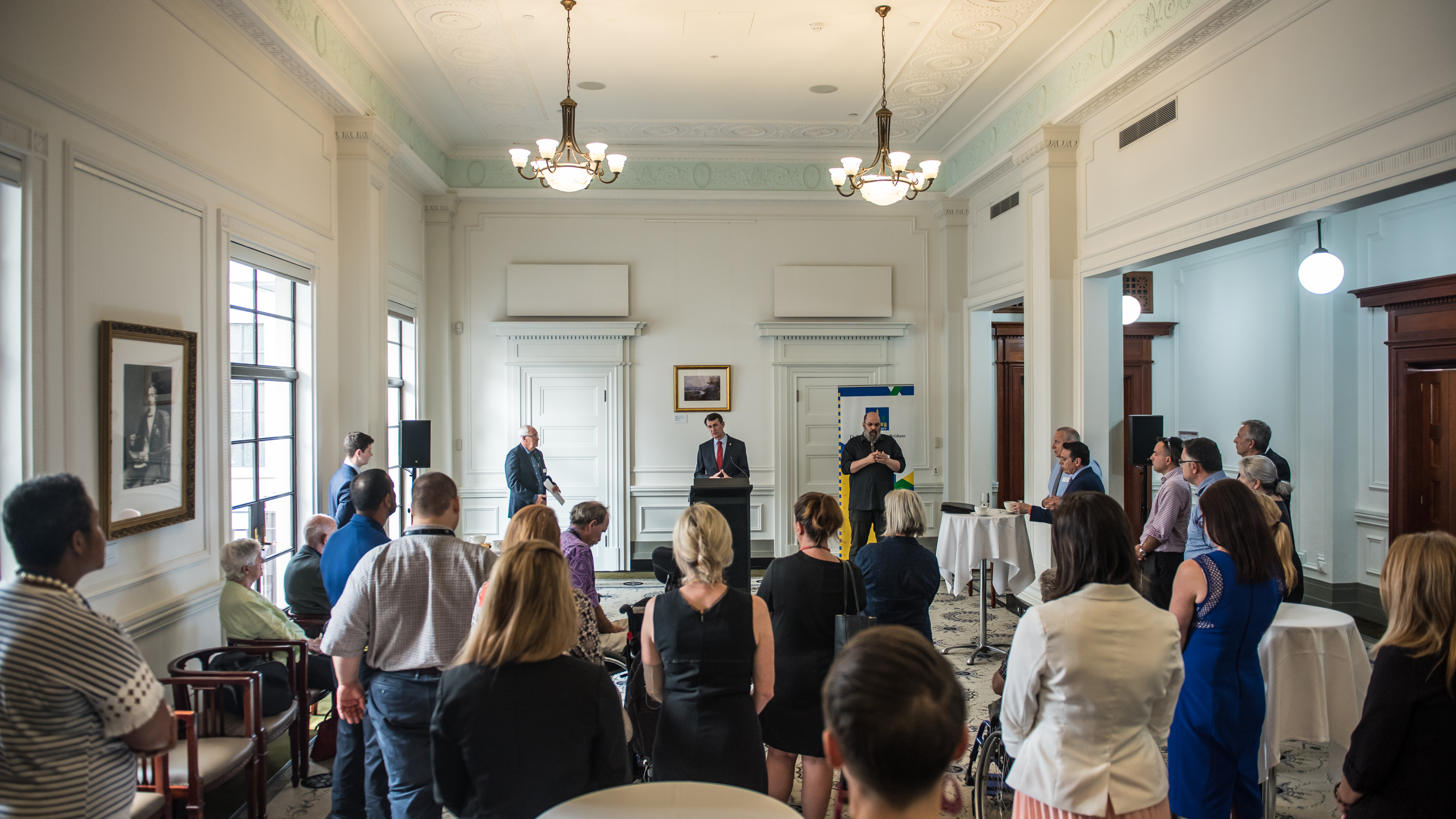
Lord Mayor Graham Quirk in the Balmoral Room, 2018

In the 1980s, work commenced on a full-scale restoration of the building, opening up the side entrance vestibules and restoring a number of the reception rooms to their original design. These reception rooms are named for former local government areas subsumed into Greater Brisbane in 1925, such as the Sherwood Room, and the Ithaca Room. From 2003 the Museum of Brisbane replaced administration offices and had galleries positioned on both sides of the building's entrance from King George Square.

=== 2010–2013 restoration ===
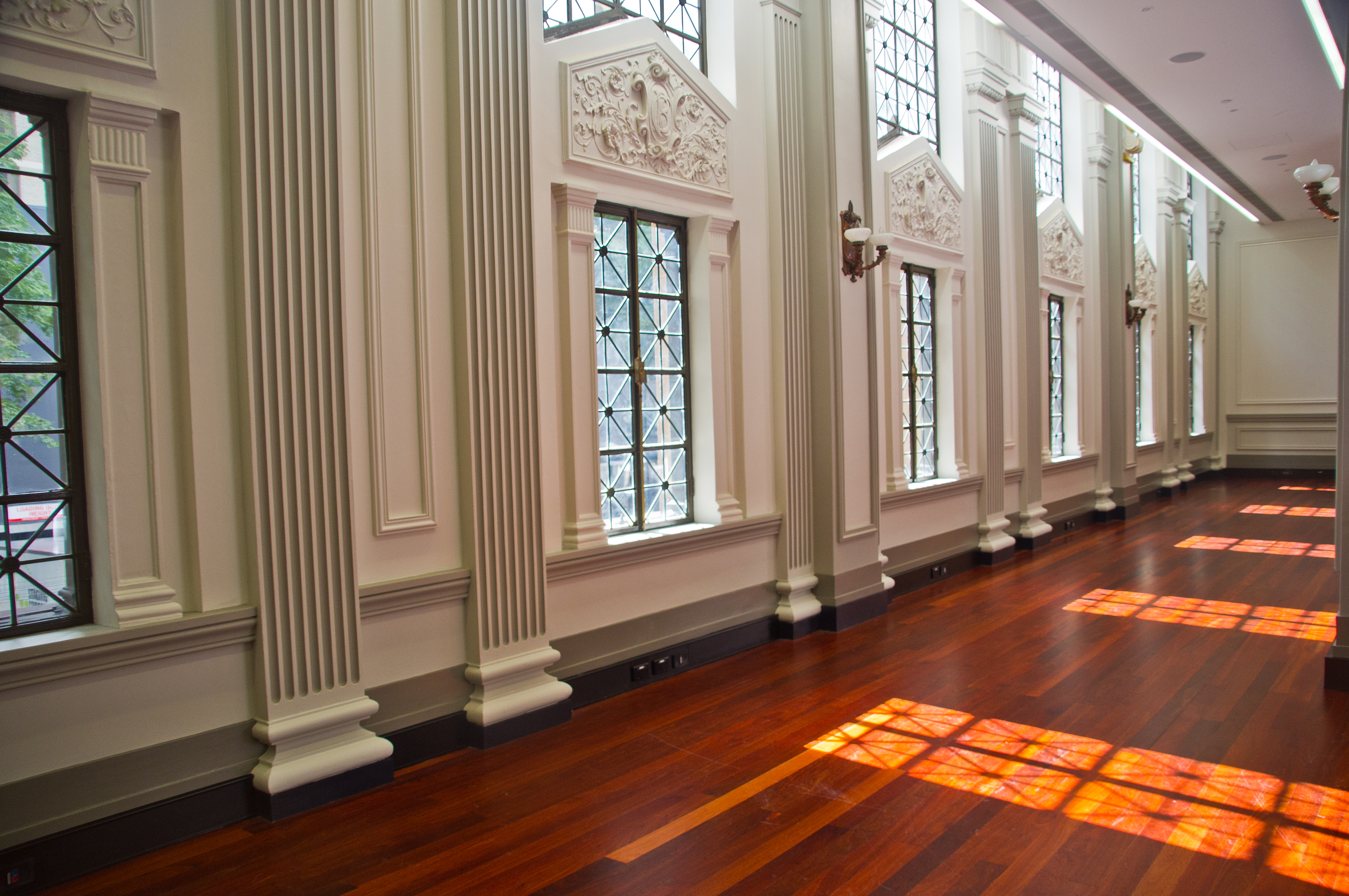
The Brisbane Room

Serious problems were identified with the building, including subsidence, concrete cancer, a lack of reinforcing in the concrete and old wiring. The Brisbane City Council set up a taskforce to address the issues, raise awareness, co-ordinate restoration and raise funds. The Brisbane City Hall closed on 31 December 2009, for the three-year restoration project.

To undergo large scale restoration works, Brisbane City Hall was closed until April 2013. The restoration works involved replacement of all building services (electrical, mechanical, fire, hydraulic systems etc.), structural works to building interiors, dome and auditorium and conservation of the original heritage surfaces and building façade. The grand organs were removed from the building for the duration of the building works. The Museum of Brisbane was combined into a single venue on the 3rd floor.

The Brisbane City Hall was officially reopened to the public on Saturday, 6 April 2013 following a re-dedication ceremony and celebrations. The renovation cost $215 million.

== Design and construction ==
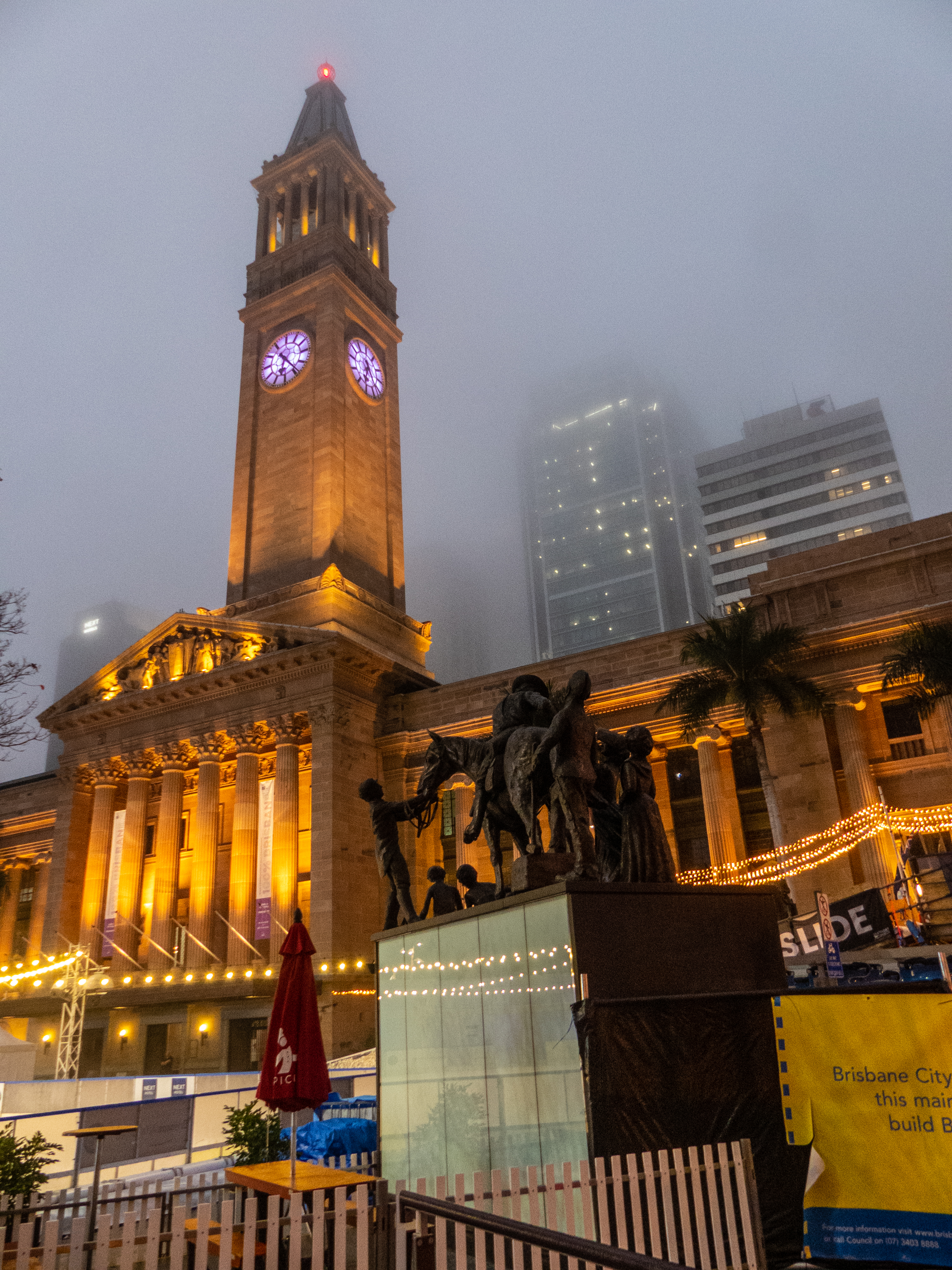
The clock tower is 91 m (298 ft) high.

The building was designed according to the Italian Renaissance style, symmetrical and formal. It has three floors and a partial basement. The total cost of the project including furniture, fit-out and furnishing was approximately £980,000. Chariot statues included in the original plans were discarded to save costs.

The columns supporting the tympanum are of the Corinthian order while the columns extending on either side are of the Ionic order. Lions heads are found above these columns. Above the main entrance is a bronze awning and the doors are also made of bronze.

=== Clock tower ===
Brisbane City Hall has a 64-metre (210 ft) clock tower (rising 87.47 metres (287.0 ft) above ground level), based on the design of the St Mark's Campanile in Venice, Italy. When it was built, the four clock faces on each side of the tower were the largest in Australia. Each clock face is 4.8 metres (16 ft) in diameter, the hour hands are 1.7 metres (5 ft 7 in), and the minute hands are 3.0 metres (9.8 ft) long. The clock has Westminster Chimes, which sound on the quarter-hour, and can be heard from the Queen St Mall and, at times, in the surrounding suburbs. The time keeping is controlled by a master clock imported from England. The dials, hands and slave mechanisms were designed and built in Brisbane by Synchonome. Above the clocks is an observation platform, accessible by lift, which can is open to the public year-round. For many years this afforded extensive views of Brisbane, but since the relaxation of height limits for surrounding buildings in the late 1960s, the view is now somewhat restricted.

=== Auditorium ===
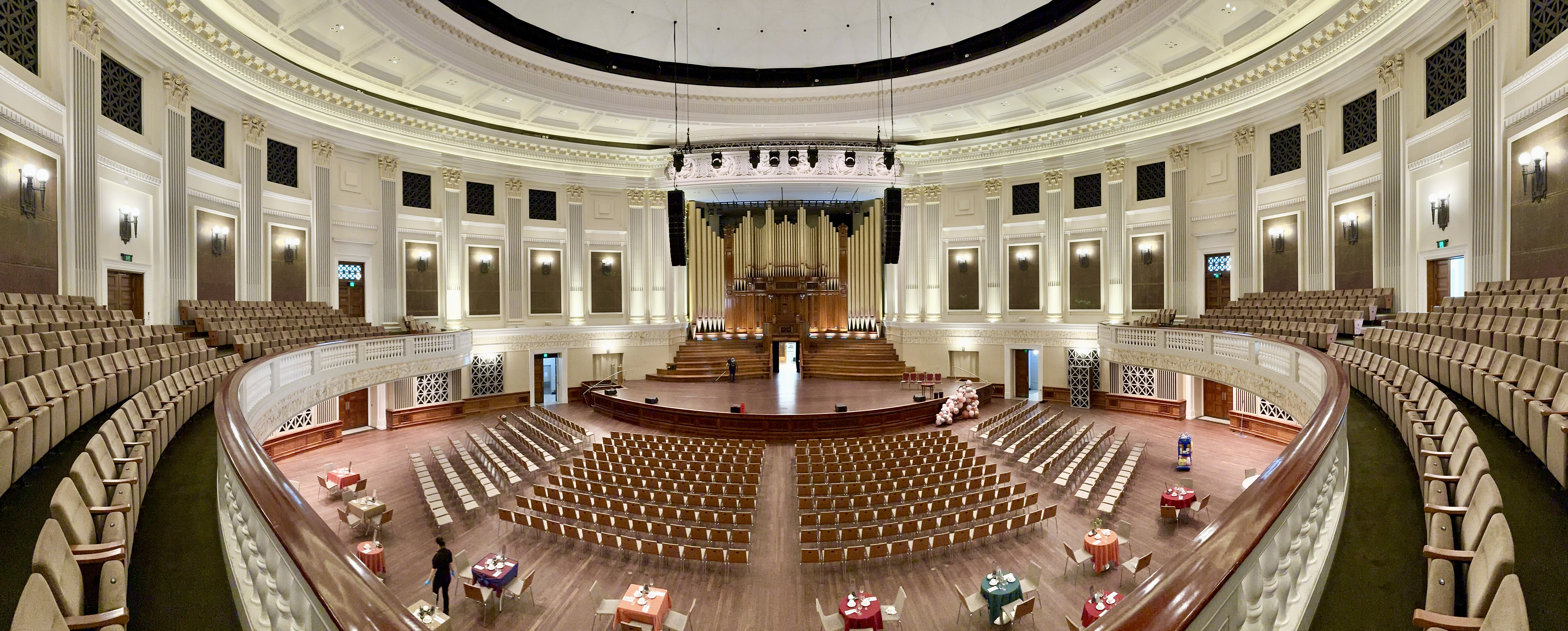
Brisbane City Hall Auditorium, 2023

The centre of City Hall features an auditorium, based on the Pantheon, Rome, and several smaller reception rooms. The auditorium is a large circular hall that can seat up to 1,600 people and is covered by the largest copper dome in the southern hemisphere. Beneath this dome there are 8,500 LED lights that display a light show. When originally built it was intended that the building would house most of the council's administrative offices, Aldermen's (councillors') offices, the Council Chamber, a public library and several reception rooms, in addition to the auditorium. As the role of local government increased in the 1950s and 1960s, the reception rooms, hallways and side entrance vestibules (in Adelaide and Ann Streets) were converted to office space. Additional offices were constructed on the roof and in the basement.

=== Construction material ===
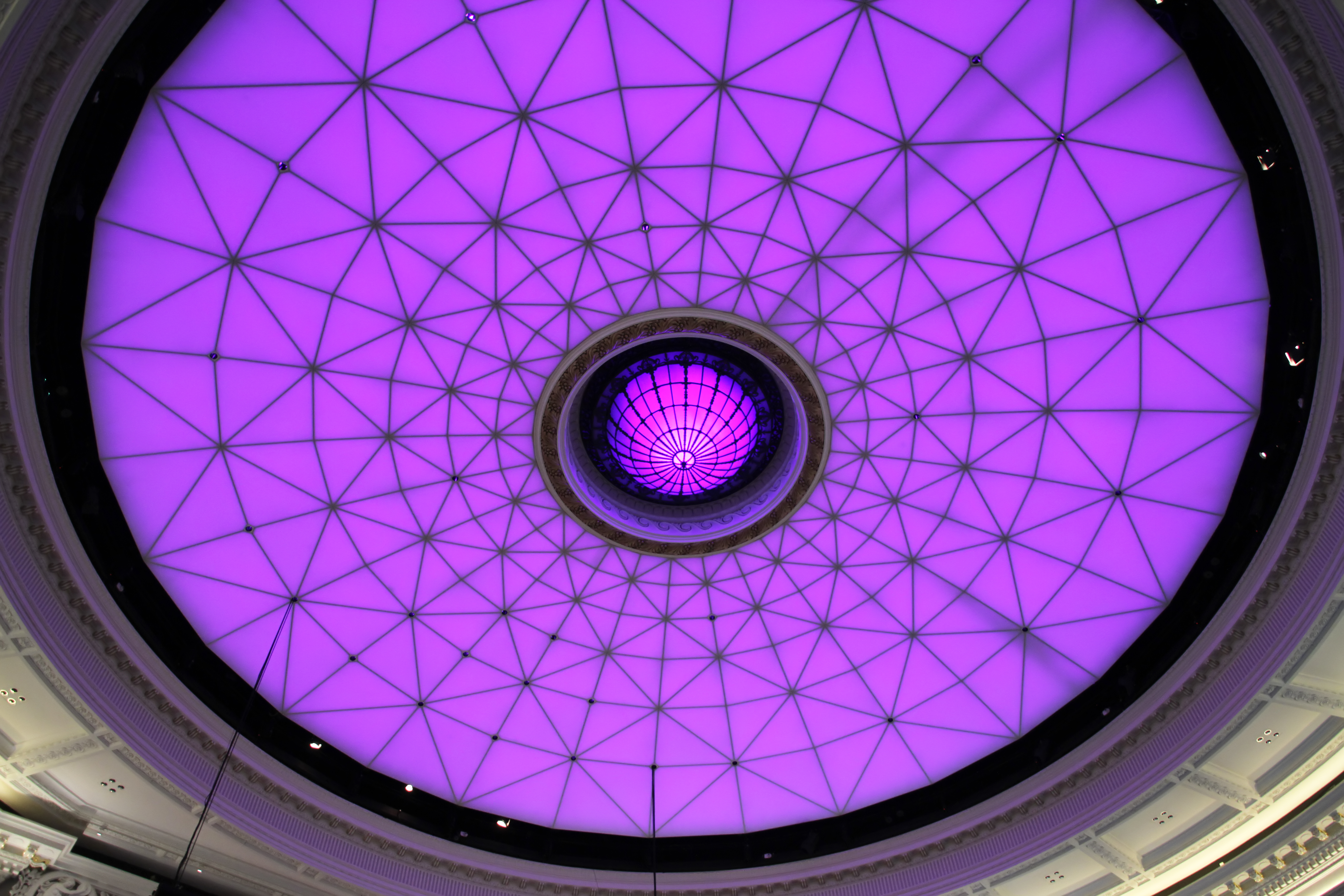
The Great Dome within the Auditorium

The building is constructed of concrete, brick and steel, with a base of granite extracted by the first builder, Arthur Midson, from his quarry at Camp Mountain near Samford. This deposit was worked just for the City Hall project. Above Midson's granite base courses, the east, north and west sides are clad in Helidon freestone, a type of sandstone extracted from Wright's Quarry at Helidon. The sandstone cladding was constructed (together with the rest of the building) by builder Douglas Dunn Carrick. The clock tower has a steel framework, and is clad in the same sandstone. The interior includes four marble columns, two of which support an arch above a ground marble staircase. Granite for the ground floor and basement was sourced from Enoggera.

== Sculptures ==
=== Tympanum ===
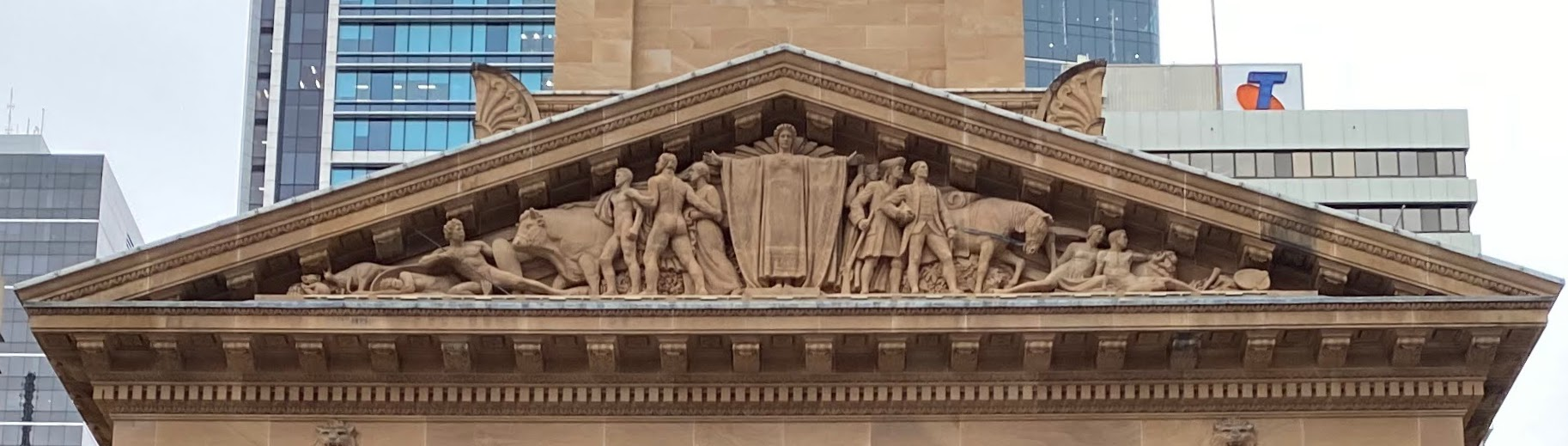
Daphne Mayo's tympanum above the King George Square entrance to the Brisbane City Hall

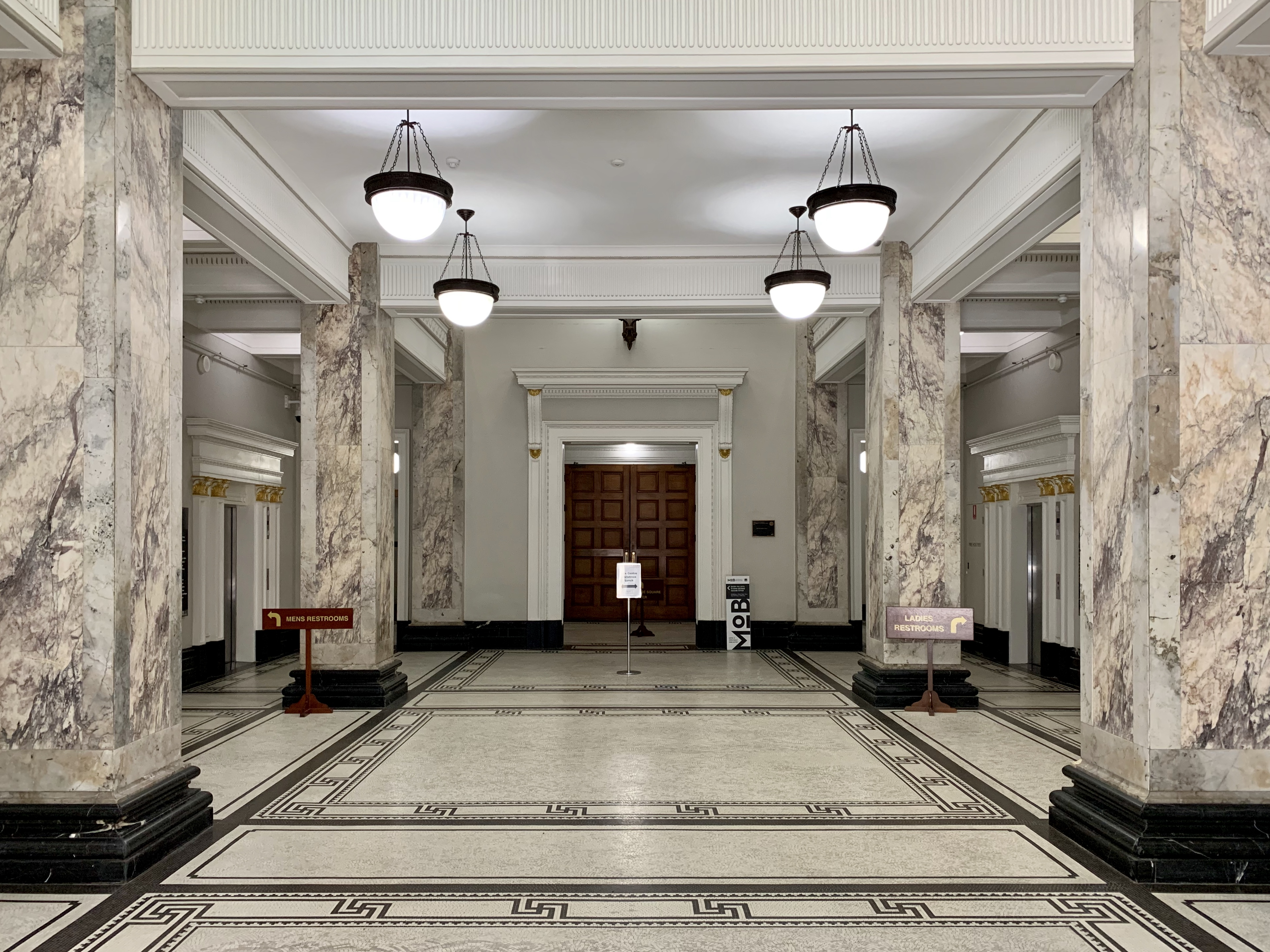
Adelaide Street foyer marble columns

The sculptured tympanum within the pediment above the portico and entrance, was carved by Brisbane sculptor Daphne Mayo during construction of the Hall and depicts the settlement of Queensland. The gown-clad female figure in the centre depicts "progress" or "enlightenment", while settlers with their cattle and explorers with their horses, move out from under her protecting arms to claim the land from the indigenous people and native animals, who are represented by two aboriginal males crouching in the left hand corner, and a fleeing kangaroo. To the right corner one can see a young European male and female, adjoined by a sheep and a row of books and an artist's palette representing the new European nation, agriculture and civilisation. According to a souvenir of the official opening, the central figure represents the state protecting its citizens, while the left hand side depicts "native life dying out at the approach of the white man" and the right hand side depicts "explorers discovering the new possibilities of the land in its industries". The tympanum measures 16.5 metres (54 ft) long with a height of 3 metres (9.8 ft) at its centre. The sculpture was unveiled eight months after the building was officially opened.

Since at least 1953, the sculptures have been the subject of controversy with the sculptor Daphne Mayo confirming at that time that the piece depicts the superiority of white colonial civilisation over Indigenous Australians. Pigeons nested in the statues at the time, leading a Methodist minister when criticising the figures to argue that 'birds should allowed to continue their work of covering the figures'. However, in 2022 Council stated it had no plans to remove or change the statues in the face of calls to do so by Indigenous activists due to their inability to be removed because of their heritage listing.

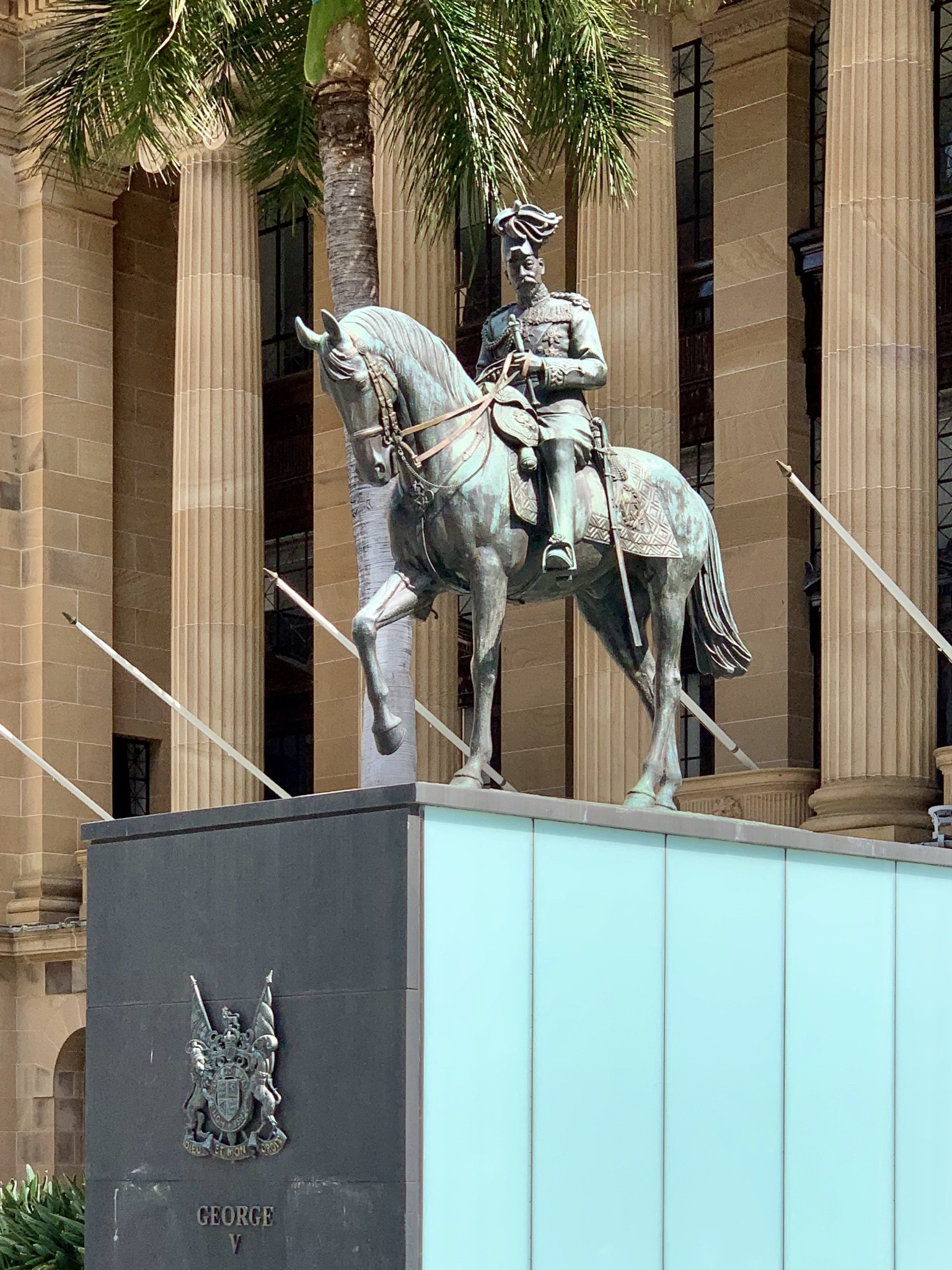
Statue of King George V at Brisbane City Hall

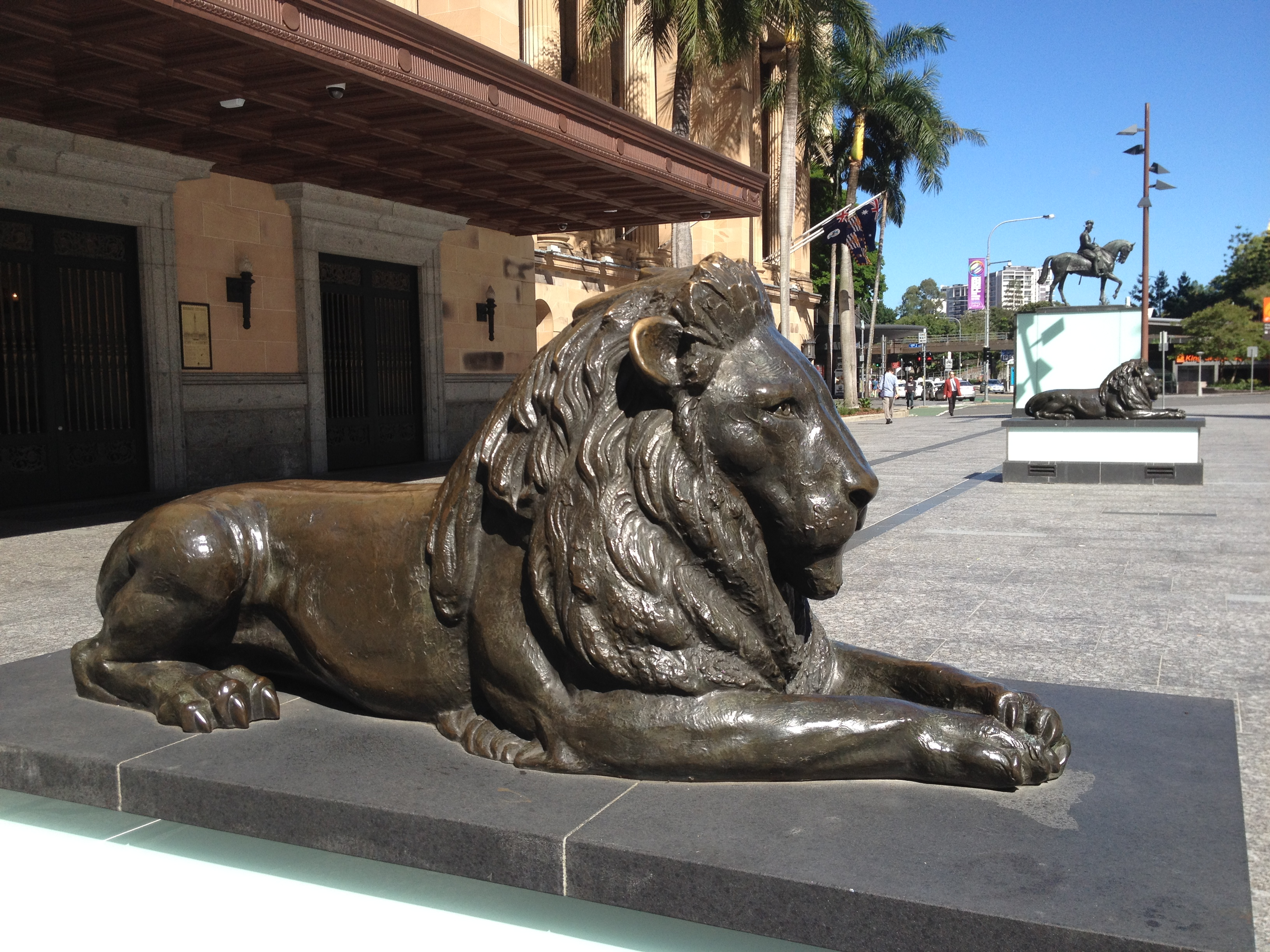
Side view of the two lion sculptures

=== King George V and lions ===
The bronze lion sculptures and statue of King George V, in front of the King George Square façade of Brisbane City Hall, were initially part of the King George V memorial, which was unveiled in 1938 as a tribute to the King from the citizens of Brisbane. The statue initially faced towards city hall, however this was changed in 1975 following a visit by Queen Elizabeth II, who remarked, 'why is grandpapa retreating?' upon seeing the statue. In 2007, the lions, modelled on the bronze lions of Trafalgar Square, and the statue were removed for renovations to the Square. They were re-incorporated into the newly redeveloped King George Square in 2009.

=== The Petrie family ===
An accompanying bronze work to complement the King George V pediment sculpture, based on the life of the pioneering Brisbane family, the Petrie's (famously of Brisbane's first mayor John Petrie), known as the Petrie Tableau.

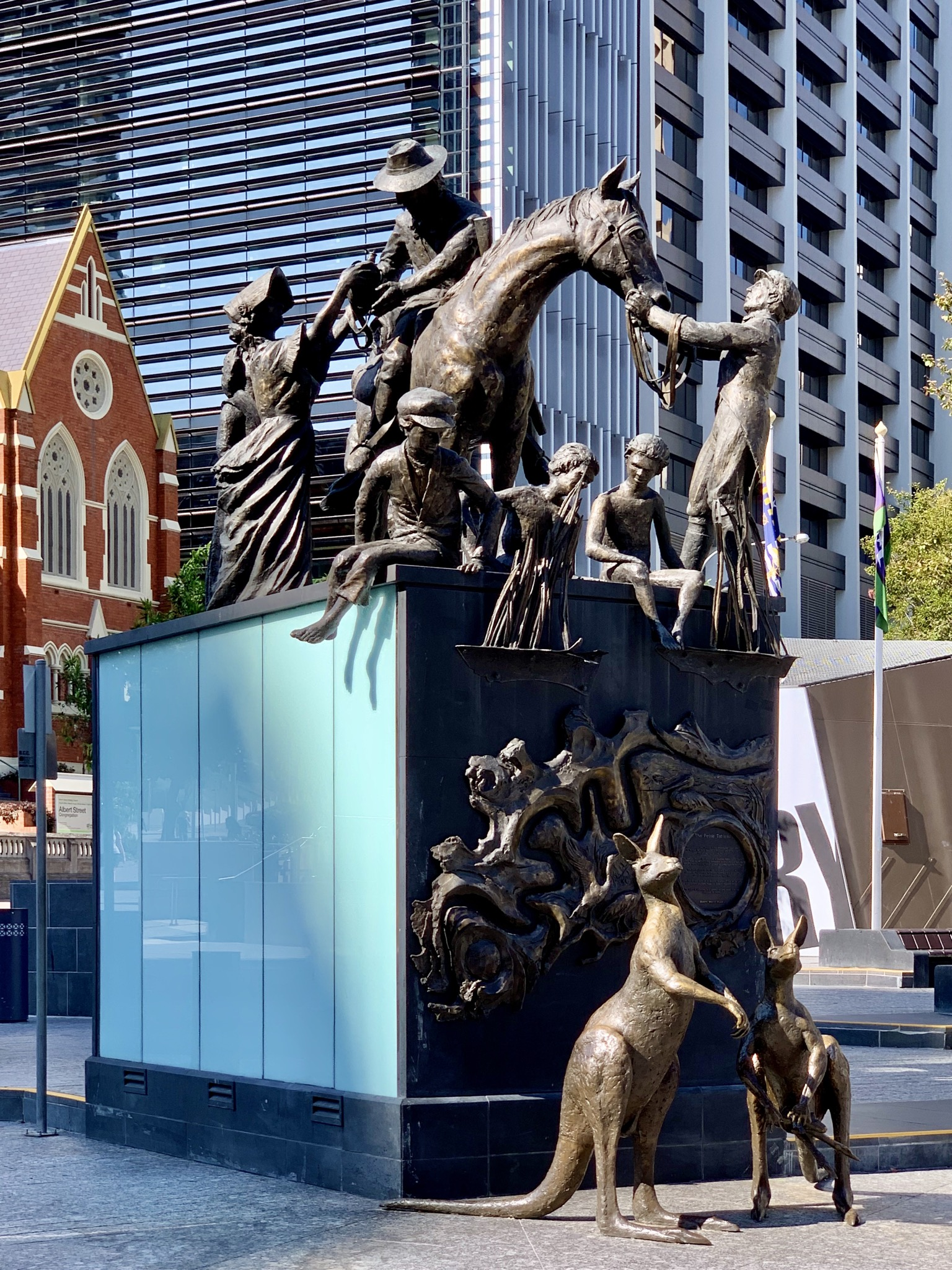
Petrie Tableau

== King George Square ==
The City Hall faces King George Square, named in honour of King George V. Originally this area, between Ann and Adelaide Streets, was much narrower than at present and was called Albert Square. In the late 1960s premises on the square opposite the City Hall were acquired by the City Council, demolished and the area levelled to form a larger square. The creation of the enlarged square was criticised in some quarters as it resulted in the removal of the original imposing flight of stone stairs in front of the building, when the ground level in front of the City Hall was raised to the level of the main entrance. When Albert Square was redeveloped into King George Square, the existing fountain at Albert Square was relocated to Wynnum.

King George Square is a common place for public gatherings, rallies and protest marches. As part of the Inner-Northern Busway project, King George Square has been remodelled.

=== Forme del Mito ===
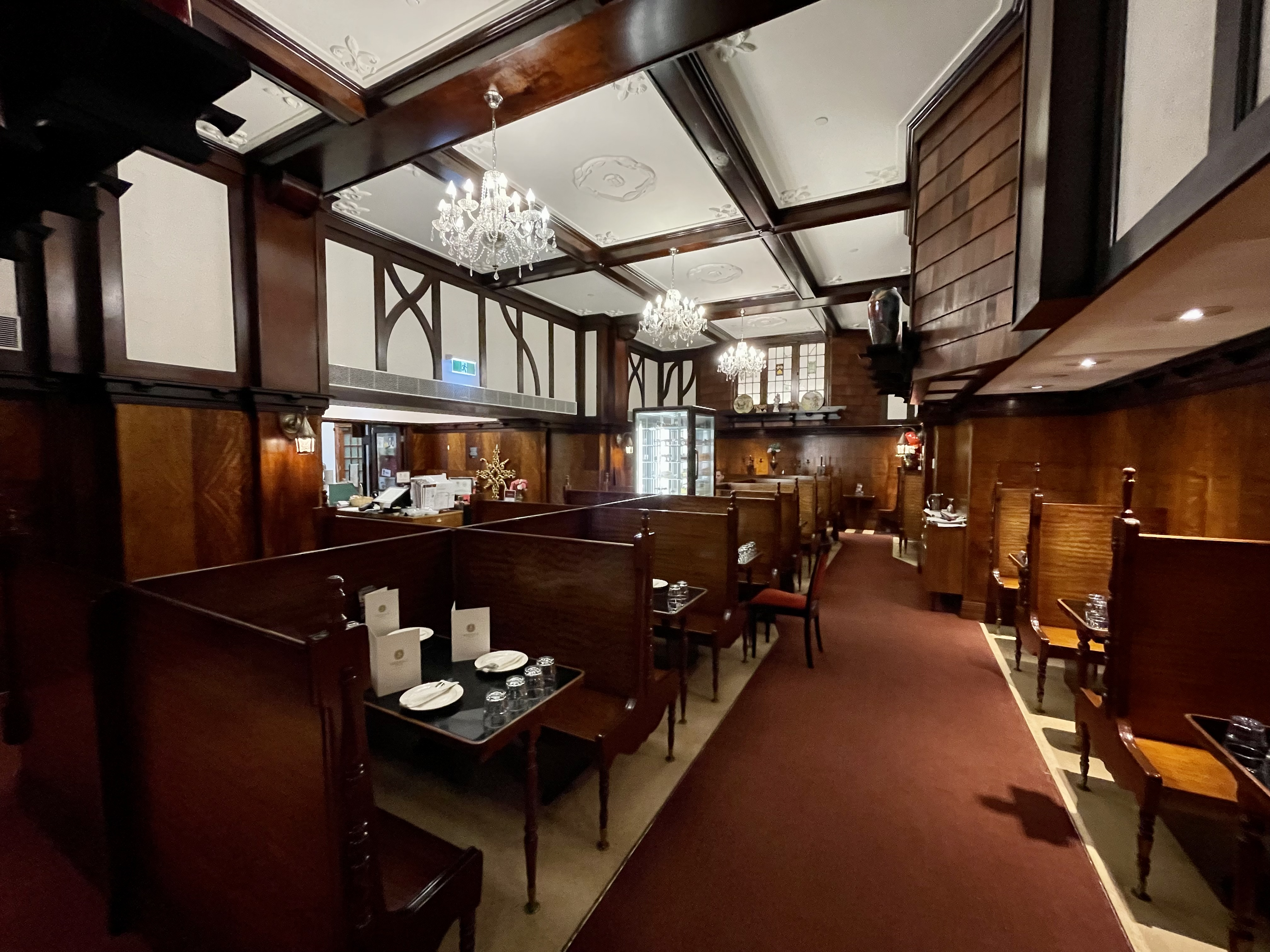
The historic Shingle Inn was replaced within Brisbane City Hall after its 2013 restoration

Forme del Mito, a collection of large bronze thematic sculptured works by Italian artist Arnaldo Pomodoro, one of the more prominent works of art collected for and displayed at Brisbane's Expo '88, previously took pride of place in King George Square. In 2007, they were removed for renovation to take place. They are now situated at the foot of Jacob's Ladder, at the entrance to Wickham Terrace.

=== 2008/2009 developments ===
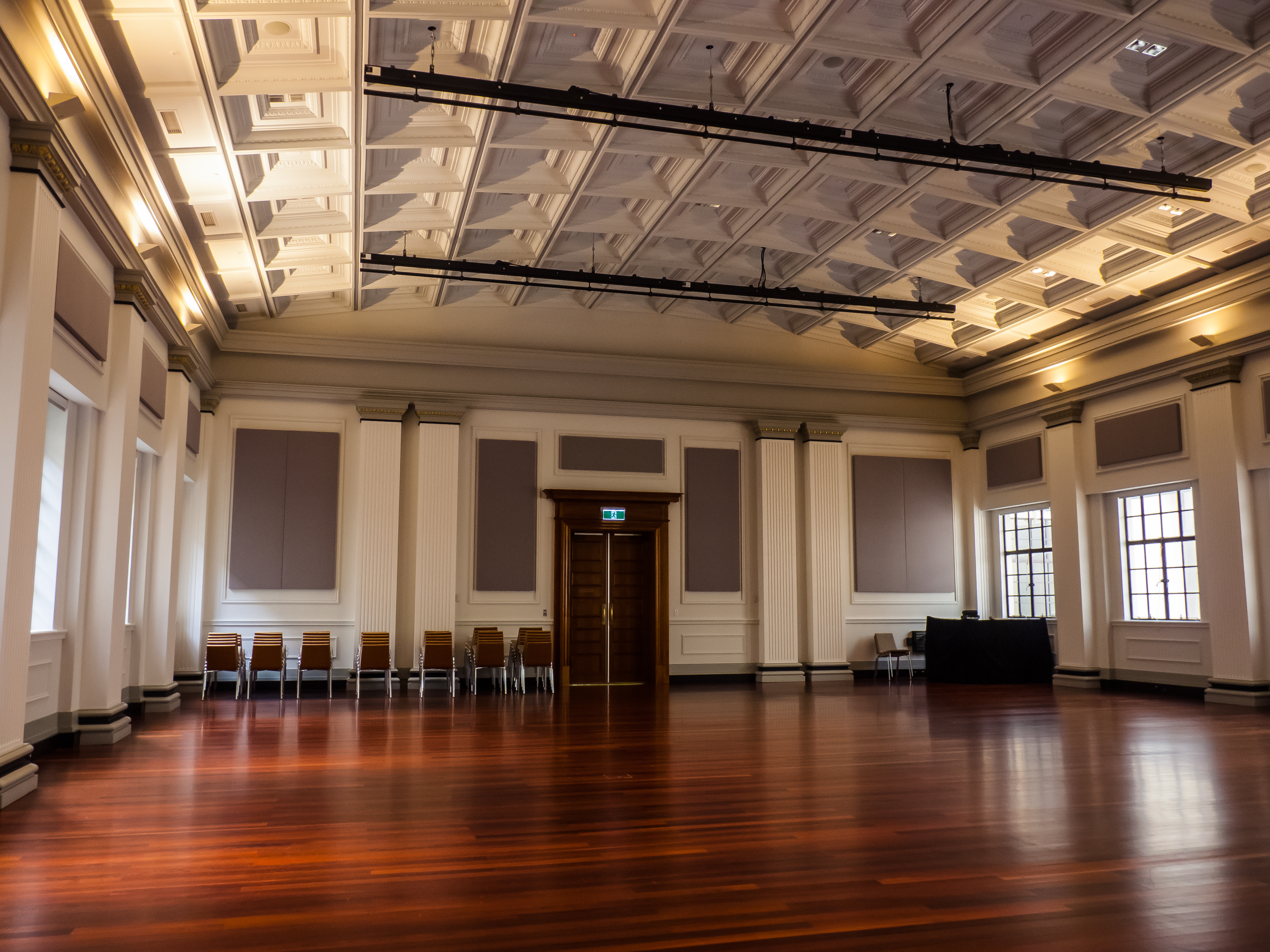
The Ithaca Auditorium

Redevelopment of King George Square, in front of the Brisbane City Hall, included a new re-modelled public plaza, restaurants, gift shops and a stage. It was completed in October 2009, for the 150th Anniversary of Brisbane as State Capital of Queensland,

It is also the site of the new underground King George Square busway station, linking the Queen Street bus station with the Roma Street Station and the northern suburbs.

== Current use ==
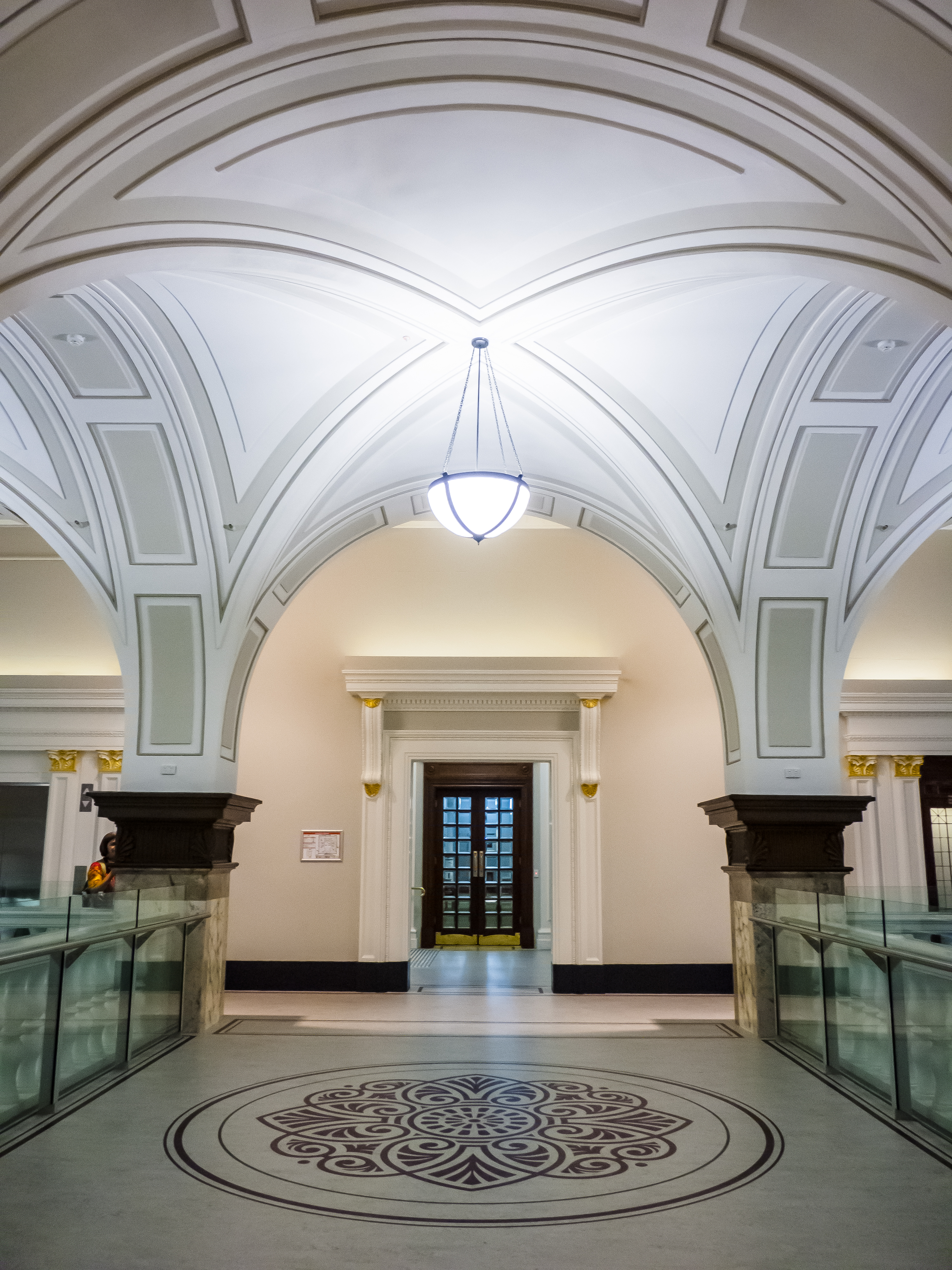
Vaulted ceiling of the Adelaide Street foyer

Following the 2010–2013 redevelopment, City Hall's role is primarily to support public gatherings, although it was the major Brisbane venue for classical concerts and arts events for decades, hosting such singers as Richard Tauber and Peter Dawson. In addition to the main auditorium, reception rooms that had been converted to administration spaces over the years have been restored to their original purpose. An industrial kitchen installed in the basement during the renovations provides catering support for events; previously external caterers had to be used, however now City Hall is managed on behalf of Brisbane City Council by EPICURE. Functions, concerts and events can still be hosted by contacting EPICURE.

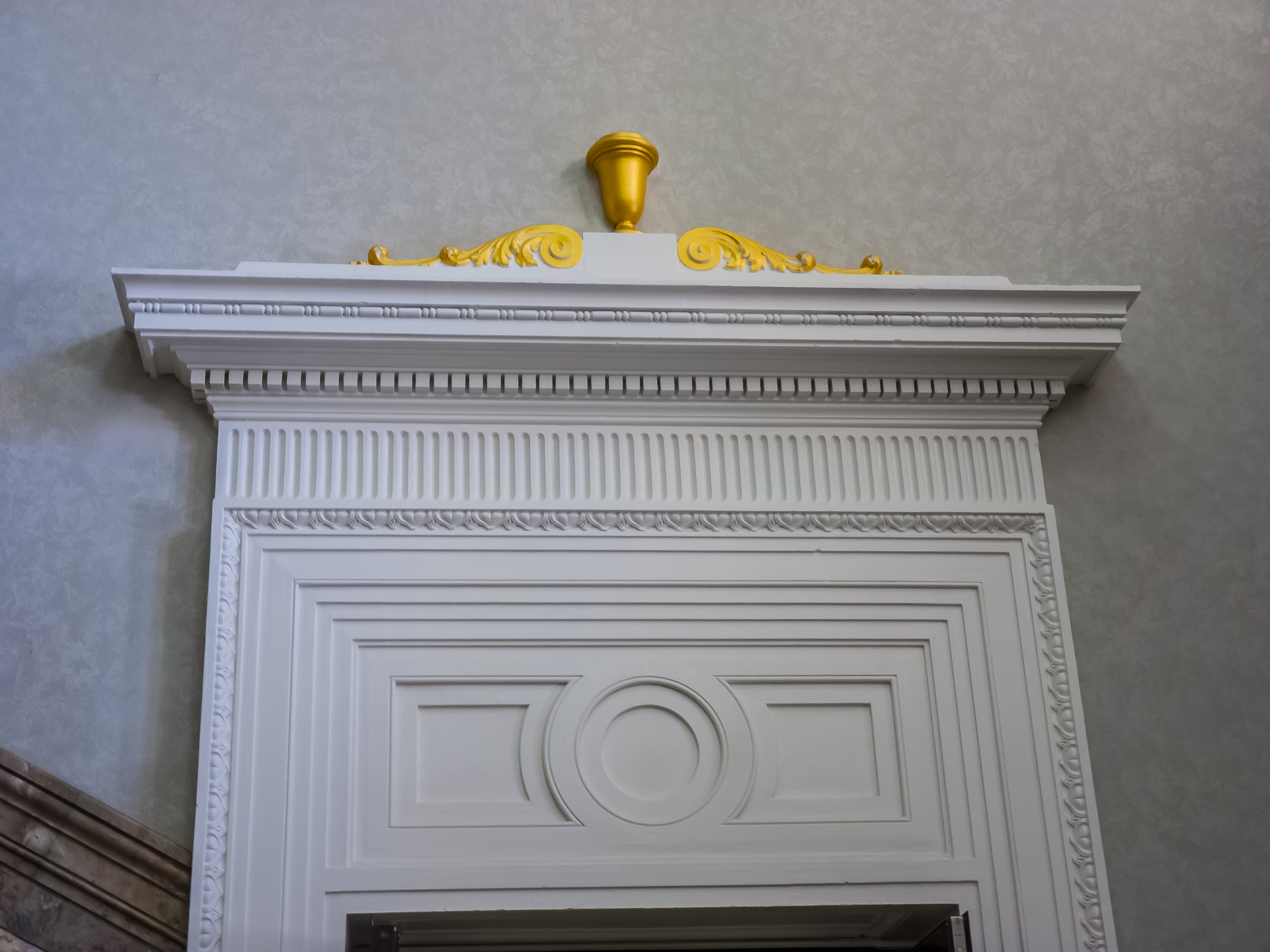
Gilded detail over foyer doors

The Museum of Brisbane is now relocated into a purpose-built facility on the rooftop. In addition to a changing program of exhibitions, the museum also operates tours of the building and tours of the clock tower.

There are two privately operated cafes in City Hall, the Red Cross Cafe and the Shingle Inn. The Shingle Inn cafe was originally not part of City Hall but was located in Edward Street and was demolished as part of the Queen's Plaza development. However, the iconic interior fittings of the Shingle Inn Cafe were removed and put into storage, allowing it to be reconstructed within the City Hall.

The only administrative functions remaining in the city hall are the Council Chambers (located on second floor of the Adelaide Street side of the building) and the Lord Mayor's and Deputy Lord Mayor's offices.

== Awards ==
In 2009, as part of the Q150 celebrations, the Brisbane City Hall was announced as one of the Q150 Icons of Queensland for its role as a "structure and engineering feat".
