= Museum of Brisbane =

Coordinates: 27°28′07.53″S 153°01′24.48″E

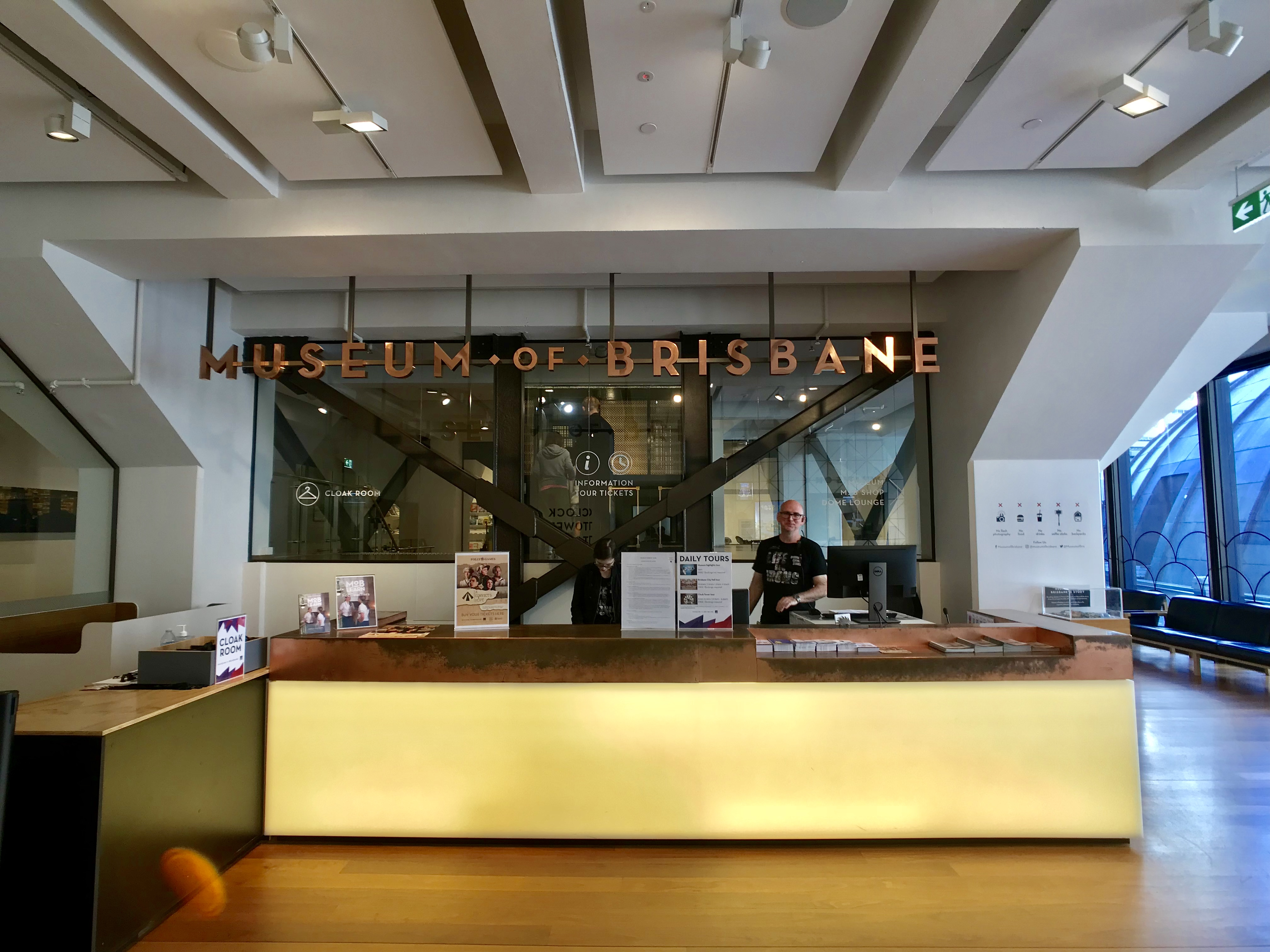
- Museum of Brisbane lobby, third floor of Brisbane City Hall
- Established: October 2003
- Location: Brisbane City Hall, King George Square
- Type: History museum
- Public transit access: King George Square busway station
- Website: www.museumofbrisbane.com.au

The Museum of Brisbane (MoB) is a history and art museum in Brisbane, Australia. The museum explores contemporary and historic Brisbane through a program of art and social history exhibitions, workshops, talks, guided tours, and children's activities. Located on Level 3 of Brisbane City Hall in the Brisbane CBD, the MoB and its staff are well-regarded for their innovation and international practice across the museum and gallery sectors.

The recipient of a number of major awards during its brief history, the museum has been twice been awarded the top honour at the prestigious Museums and Galleries National Awards as well as multiple Queensland Museum and Gallery Achievement Awards, Museums Australia Multimedia and Publications Design Awards and National Trust of Queensland Awards.

== History ==
Museum of Brisbane (MoB) was opened in October 2003 and occupied a space on the ground floor of City Hall. The museum replaced the Brisbane City Gallery which opened in 1977. In 2010, when City Hall closed for restoration, the Museum was relocated to Ann Street. On 6 April 2013 the Museum was reopened after returning to City Hall where it now occupies a purpose-built space on the building's third floor. Since its reopening the Museum has been an independent, not-for-profit arts organisation overseen by a board chaired by Sallyanne Atkinson.

== Collection ==
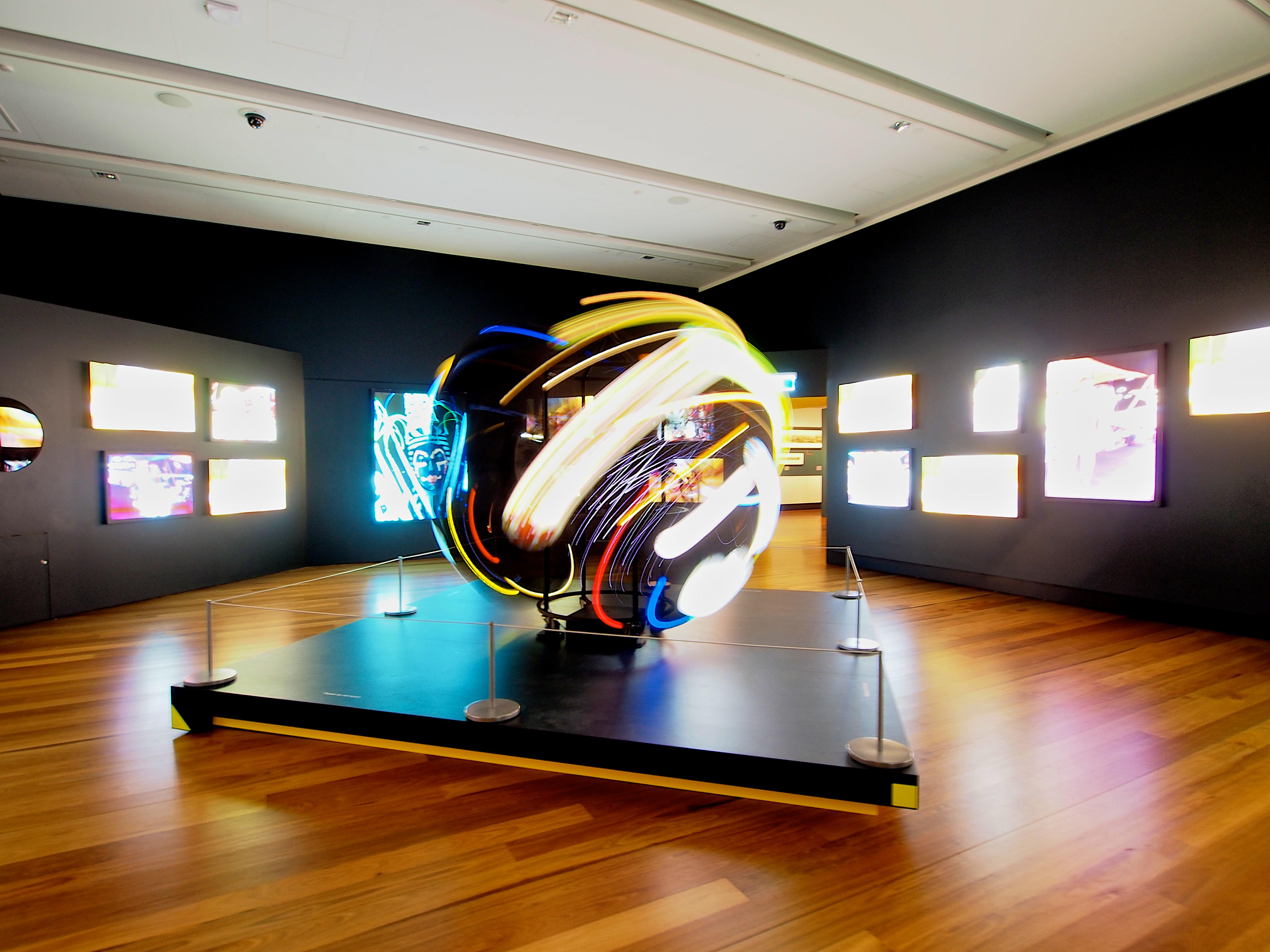
An exhibition about World Expo 88

The Museum of Brisbane manages two collections, the Museum of Brisbane Collection and the City of Brisbane Collection. The collection was created in 1859 when the Town of Brisbane (a local government area which preceded the City of Brisbane) was founded. It has grown to have more than 9,000 items including commissioned works by local artists, the largest textile collection from designers Easton Pearson and historical objects.

== Visiting ==
Museum of Brisbane is open daily from 10:00 to 17:00, except for New Year's Day, Good Friday, Christmas Day, and Boxing Day, when it is closed. Entry to the Museum is free, except for special exhibitions and programs.

The nearest bus station to the Museum is King George Square, while Central and Roma Street are the nearest train stations. Paid parking is available in the King George Square Car Park, which is located underneath King George Square.
