= Greeks of Chomedey =

Grecs de Chomedey
- Founded: 2010s
- Years active: 2010s–present
- Territory: Chomedey, Laval, Quebec, Canada
- Activities: Drug trafficking, extortion, loan sharking and violence

The Grecs de Chomedey (French: Les Grecs de Chomedey), also known as the Greeks of Chomedey or Chomedey Greeks, are an organized crime group based in Chomedey, Laval, Quebec, Canada.
