= Greeks (Vernon criminal organization) =

Criminal organization based in Vernon, British Columbia

The Greeks
- Founded: 1990s
- Years active: 1990s–2000s
- Territory: Vernon, British Columbia and the Okanagan
- Activities: Drug trafficking, violence and murder

The Greeks was a criminal organization based in Vernon, British Columbia, Canada. It was involved in the illegal drug trade in the Okanagan region, including trafficking cocaine and heroin.

The Greeks became the subject of a police investigation after three men connected to the Vernon drug trade were killed between 2004 and 2005. A criminal trial began in May 2011 in the Supreme Court of British Columbia and lasted 19 months, the longest jury trial in British Columbia at the time. Five men associated with the Greeks were convicted for their roles in the killings. The leader of the gang, Peter Manolakos, received a life sentence with no possibility of parole for 25 years for a first-degree murder conviction. Two other men had previously pleaded guilty to murder-related offences in 2007 and were sentenced to prison.

Vernon lawyer William Jacob Mastop had represented Manolakos and assisted the criminal organization. Mastop pleaded guilty in December 2012 to participating in or contributing to the activity of a criminal organization for the purpose of facilitating an indictable offence.
