= Feather and Bone: The Crow Chronicles =

Trilogy of young adult fantasy novels by Clem Martini

- The Mob; The Plague; The Judgment
- Author: Clem Martini
- Country: Canada
- Language: English
- Genre: Young adult fiction, fantasy
- Publisher: KCP Fiction
- Published: 2004-2006
- Media type: Print (hardback)

Feather and Bone: The Crow Chronicles is a trilogy of young adult fantasy novels written by Canadian playwright and screenwriter Clem Martini. All of the main characters are crows, which are not so much anthropomorphic as simply animals of human intelligence who have their own culture, religion, and folktales based on Native American mythology. While the novels take place in the "real world," elements such as the quest-like structure of the plot and the existence of a prophetic crow guided by "the Maker" lie somewhere between the realm of reality, fantasy, and the supernatural. The trilogy is written in the first person minor point of view, with the first book from the point of view of Kalum, and the second and third from the point of view of Katakata.

The trilogy was optioned early on by the entertainment company Nelvana, which is known for its children's animation. The first volume, The Mob, was published in 2004 with The Plague following in 2005 and The Judgment in 2006. The trilogy's themes contain similarities to a lesser known novel, The Crow Chronicles, by Indian author and birdwatcher Ranjit Lal, which was published in paperback format by Penguin Publications in 1996.

== Inspiration ==
=== Inspiration to begin writing the trilogy ===
Clem Martini became interested in writing about crows when he saw a large number of the birds cawing, seemingly to each other, while waiting for his daughter's school bus to come. He also thought about the poor public image of crows, and how smart and helpful they really are. He wanted people to be aware of how great these birds really were, so he wanted to write them that way. When deciding that the novel would be written for preteens, Martini says that he wrote it with his daughters in mind. Despite being a playwright, Martini never saw himself being a novelist until he got the inspiration for The Mob.

=== Inspiration for certain elements in the trilogy ===
Martini says that the reason that almost all of the crows' names start with K (with the exception of Erkala) was because of the "Kaw" sound that crows make. Martini had a "rough idea" that when he wrote The Mob it would become a trilogy, and had a general outline of what would happen that he later got rid of because in the second book, "there were a number of crows who suddenly started talking... and I didn't know who they were. ... So I made room for them."

== Plot summaries ==
=== The Mob (Book One) ===
The Mob
- Publication date: August 1, 2004
- Media type: Print (Hardback)
- Pages: 240
- ISBN: 978-1-55337-574-6
- Followed by: The Plague

The six crow clans of the Kinaar family are travelling to the Gathering Tree for the week-long celebration of Gathering where they recall their history, rejoice, rest, find a mate, remember members of the flock that have died, and select their "Chooser", or leader.

At one of these Gatherings, a malicious cat known as the Red kills a nestling, and Kyp ru Kurea ru Kinaar, an impulsive young crow, organizes a "mob", or a brutal and swift attack of multiple crows, to kill Red. However, Kyp is charged with several transgressions, the most serious among them being bringing danger to the flock. The Chooser, Kalum ru Kurea ru Kinaar, decides that instead of banishing Kyp that the young crow will be evicted for the remaining days of the Gathering and will have to fly back to his clan alone.

Kyp chooses a quiet little tree area about a mile away to spend his time. While Kyp is evicted, one crow around his age by the name of Kym breaks the rules by visiting him frequently to talk with him. In addition to Kym, Kyp meets Kuper, a large and quiet outsider whose entire nest family has died; because of this, he does not consort much with the Kinaar crows. Kyp and Kym spot humans, and Kym shows Kyp that she can speak a couple words of the human tongue that the humans repeat back to her.

Soon after Kyp's eviction the temperature drops and the rains turn to snow, creating a blizzard that threatens all of the crows of the Kinaar. In addition, Kyp finds that there is an underground shelter near where he's chosen to spend his eviction that would be perfect for hiding, though it breaks all the crow rules. Kyp, not wanting to leave the Family to fend for themselves, breaks the rules of his eviction by coming back to the Gathering Tree to lead crows into the cavern. Some of them know it is their only hope for survival and follow him underground, while others refuse to disobey rules and stay aboveground to die.

While underground, the crows believe that they are safe only to find that the Red knew other cats. These cats were in the cavern and, seeing the crows so calm, took this as an opportunity to attack. The crows manage to kill the cats, but not without many of their own fatalities, including Kuper.

=== The Plague (Book Two) ===
The Plague
- Publication date: August 1, 2005
- Media type: Print (Hardback)
- Pages: 267
- ISBN: 978-1-55337-667-5
- Preceded by: The Mob
- Followed by: The Judgment

While on an excursion with Kalum, Kyp and Kym prepare themselves for the next gathering of the flock, hoping that one of them will be chosen to succeed Kalum as the next Chooser, so that they can change those ancient traditions which have become harmful. However, a plague suddenly breaks loose, and both Kym and Kalum contract it. Kym is taken away by scientists wanting to study her, whilst Kalum is killed by a vengeful, crazed Kuper, angry that nobody attempted to rescue him or find out if he was really dead. He also believes that Kym, of whom he had feelings for, died of the plague. He tries to kill Kyp, believing it to be Kyp's fault and that Kyp did not try to rescue him because he wanted Kym for himself. Kyp tries to tell Kuper that Kym has actually been taken away by the humans. Kuper, who was himself taken away by the humans after his battle with the cats, does not believe Kyp due to his maddened state.

Kyp escapes, injured, and spends a month recuperating in a burrow, despite the laws against it. He then meets Katakata when they fight over a fish. Katakata is a crow who was banished from his clan due because the new leadership enforced new religious laws which Katakata did not believe in. When Katakata learns that Kyp is headed looking for a female crow (Kym) who can speak with humans, he tells Kyp that he heard a rumor about such a crow from the east. Katakata joins Kyp in his journey, feeling that perhaps the Maker has brought them together for a reason.

Kyp remains reclusive and determined, occasionally straining his new friendship with Katakata. They are soon joined by a group of three crows: the talkative Kyf, her quiet brother Kaf, and her other brother Kwaku, a small crow who was banished from his flock due to his prophetic visions. Katakata takes a disliking to this group, but Kyp thinks that they are perhaps another gift from the Maker. Kwaku's visions appear to be helpful, but Katakata is still skeptical. When Katakata eats some poisoned meat left out by the humans, a strange crow named Erkala who tests Katakata. Luckily, Katakata tests true, and is given the remedy. Erkala takes them to her rocky shoreline home, Where she tells them of how her mother died after they were driven out to sea in a storm and she made her own way in the world, even moving in with a family of rats. Erkala asks to join them.

The group then journeys on and meets up with a much larger flock of young crows in need of guidance. Kyp manages to guide nearly all of them to safety when they are attacked by humans with guns, thanks to one of Kwaku's cryptic visions. However, they then only narrowly escape once more when they are confronted by Kuper, now the Chooser for an enormous flock of disciples who believe his words of hatred towards the humans and follow him into the human cities to scavenge, believing that the Maker wants them to survive because they are the greatest of all creatures, and also wants them to change much of their old ways.

They then journey to a large human city (New York City, although the crow's do not recognize it by that name). After living in Central Park for weeks, they finally find Kym in a building caged up with many other birds. The humans are taking their blood, and Kym suspects it has something to do with fighting the plague. Despite her interest in the humans, Kym wants to be freed. Erkala enlists the aid of the rats, despite the laws forbidding crows to go underground. "The Maker's tests are never easy," she explains. Together, Kyp, Kwaku, Erkala, and Katakata journey up into the building to free Kym and the other birds. However, the building catches on fire at that moment. Kwaku manages to guide nearly everybody to freedom and safety, but he himself is engulfed by the flames and perishes. Katakata later has a dream in which he is seated in a tree with Kwaku, and Kwaku gives him and Kyp some final guidance before his spirit departs forever. When he recovers from the ordeal inside the burning building, Kyp leads the flock away from the human city in search of a land where they can live in peace and safety.

=== The Judgment (Book Three) ===
The Judgment
- Publication date: August 1, 2006
- Media type: Print (Hardback)
- Pages: 299
- ISBN: 978-1-55337-756-6
- Preceded by: The Plague

The beginning of the third book starts out just a small while after the end of the second book. All of the non-crows released from human confinement have left with the exception of a single magpie, and those that are crows have joined Kyp's flock. They travel together without much difficulty for a while, although there is one crow named Kryk who eats little, nests away from the rest of the flock, and flies at the end. The magpie finds her roost and, before she leaves, tells the flock, in crow, that the Collection has doubled in size since they last saw the flock of crows.

One night when they are resting, an owl comes along. Kyp tells them to stick close to the tree, but some of them fly out and are attacked by the owl. Among those is Kaf, leaving Kyf the only living member of her family. When flying away along the coast, they become hungry because there is little they can eat. They find a loading dock with tons of fish, and Kryk creates the sound of a police siren. The humans run away distracted and the crows gather to eat fish. Katakata finds that a human dropped one of their rings and wears it like a necklace. Although it slows him down and occasionally chokes him when he perches, he does not drop it.

When the Collection comes looking for them, Kyp's flock realizes that the magpie was right, and now there are a hundred thousand crows in the Collection. They manage to avoid him by leading the Collection away from the majority of crows, but Kyp decides that they need to fly more carefully now, so they will follow cars at night to make sure that they cannot be seen by anybody else. While they are doing this nocturnal behavior, when they come to perch during the day they find that there is an elderly crow by the name of Kuru who was trapped under a branch. He had just fought off three of the Collection and was almost dead. Since he was an elder and therefore of the highest respect and knowledge, Kyp invited him to fly with them. However, once flying with them he took to angering the crows by telling them that they are useless and taking over Kyp's control as Chooser. Right before they are about to get rid of Kuru, Kyp decides that they cannot keep running from the Collection; they will need to band together more crows and fight back. Kuru says that the Urkana, a massive band of a million crows, is real and that he visited them once, so he leads them to the Urkana.

Once at the Urkana, Kryk tells Kym that when he was young, he was captured by a human. That human taught him to call for help on command. When he called for help, he got food. Eventually he was put on a leash and called for help. When the crows would answer his call, the human would shoot them. Kym tells him that sometime he's got to tell the rest of the flock about this, and he begrudgingly agrees. Soon the Collection come with the same intention: for the Urkana to join them. They both tell the Urkana why their flock should be picked, and before the assembly is to begin, where the elders will decide who they will join, Ur-Ryk, an Urkana crow, spots Kryk and starts attacking him. Ur-Ryk tells the Urkana about what Kryk did, and Kryk's punishment is Banishment from all three flocks forever.

When the assembly begins, one of the elders gives his reasons for joining the Collection, which angers Kuru into unleashing a powerful speech that postpones the rest of the assembly. The next morning Kuru is found dead. The crows think it is a variety of reasons from the cold giving him hypothermia to his heart giving out after the speech, but Kyp, Kym, Kyf, Kata, and Erkala figure out that in the middle of the night, Kuper killed Kuru and made it look like he was killed of natural causes. They discuss this behind an owl's nest, and Kyup, a scout of the Collection, tries to listen in but is killed by the owl.

Two mornings after, the assembly begins again, and when a very elderly crow gives his reasons for joining the Collection, Kyp becomes as angered as Kuru, but instead of giving a speech, he says that he is taking the flock elsewhere and they will never become a part of the Collection. This sends Kuper into a rage and he starts fighting Kyp. With each attack the Urkana draws away from the Collection. Kyp never gets hurt because of his flying agility. One move he performs with grace, but he does not see a car coming and gets hit. Afterwards, Erkala requests that she leave the flock. The next night when Katakata is walking alone, he throws the ring off of his shoulders. Kyp hears the sound and calls for Kata to come by and tells him that he pretended to be dead, and he and Erkala had planned it the whole time, using the body of Kyup in place of Kyp's own. He told Kata to make sure that the flock slowly leaves the Urkana and only then would he and Erkala come back to join them. Kata follows this plan, but soon afterwards hunters come and plan to kill the crows. Kyp comes back to warn all of the crows. The Urkana and Kyp's flock go back to the fallback nests, but the Collection begins attacking the humans, and eventually the others do, too. Kyp hears Kym calling for help and tries to help her, but instead gets caught in a spiderweb when Kuper and Kryk come. Kuper had told Kryk to imitate Kym's call and promised Kryk that he would have a new home once they were finished. Kuper then says to Kryk that his new home would be among the dead and tries to kill Kryk. However, Kryk survives and manages to attack Kuper back into the spiderweb, where Kyp grabs hold of Kuper's leg. Then, a tornado strikes and Kuper is caught between a moment of self-preservation and revenge. He hesitates, and a willow branch knocks him unconscious. He and Kryk are pulled into the tornado and are killed, while Kyp, though pulled in as well, survives.

Meanwhile, Erkala, Kata, Kyf, Kym, and Kymnyt are caught inside a car while trying to avoid hail, and humans get in the car. Kym says that when she was flying behind a car she saw that the humans could open a window, and she was going to try to find the thing that opened it. She said that if the humans looked back to distract them. When the humans looked back, Erkala tried attacking them and the others followed suit until Kym had opened the window and they flew out. They found the area where the tornado had hit and found Kyp, alive but blind. Together they decided to move as a group. Kyp's left eye fully recovered and his right eye got a little better, but his vision was no longer what it had always been. Meanwhile, Kata and Erkala had chicks together and flew together as a pair. The trilogy ends with a story of the Maker creating three new mates for Great Crow after Kaynu Firstmate died, and how Great Crow chose the crow, because it bleeds and feels pain but recovers in the end.

== Characters ==
=== Crows ===
- Kyp (ru Kurea ru kinaar) is a rather hot-headed young crow who becomes more mature as the series moves along. During his childhood, he was treated as an inferior due to a physical handicap, but he grew up strong and overcame it. He fights against many of the traditional, hypocritical ways, but believes in keeping other traditions alive. He believes he is guided by the Maker in searching for a natural, safe place where himself and his flock. He is strongly attached to Kym, a young female crow.
- Kym (ru Kemna ru kinaar) is a gentle but outspoken young crow. She believes in diplomacy with the humans even if it goes against tradition, and can speak some of the human language.
- Kuper (ru Kurea) is a crow who is almost killed by the cats, and, after a period of captivity with the humans, becomes murderous and renames himself "Urku", which means "the Collector". He gathers a large group of disciples, whom he calls "The Collection". They follow his religious interpretations and rejection of certain customs. He dies from a tornado in the third book.
- Kalum is the Chooser of the Kurea clan. He is wise but long-winded. He recognises the need for change. Kuper kills him in the second book.
- Katakata (ru Kamu) is a crow who first appears in the second book. He is a bit skeptical, as he has lived as a loner for much of his life after being banished from his clan (he refused to perform th prayer and purification after eating the forbidden scavenge from around the human settlements). He is a thief, believing that the Maker intends for him to be "resourceful". However, he also shows much kindness and bravery towards Kyp and his flock of outcasts. Katakata eventually becomes mates with Erkala in the third book.
- Erkala (ru Erkata ru Eru) is a female hooded crow from Europe ("across the waters"), with white feathers that the North Americans do not have. She is somewhat harsh, viewing nearly every situation as a test from the Maker, yet willing to risk her life to free the captive birds. She is on good terms with the rats, the only crow the others have ever seen who has made contact with that species. Erkala first appears in the second book and survives throughout the rest of the series and eventually becoming the mate of Katakata.
- Kyf is a thin, prim, but slightly bedraggled crow who left her flock when her brother Kwaku was banished. She is talkative, and while not unkind, can be critical and gets on Katakata's nerves. She is very protective of her brothers. Kyf first appears in the second book.
- Kaf' is a quiet, bedraggled outcast, brother to Kyf and Kwaku. He rarely speaks, and seems very ordinary, with the exception of his loyalty to Kwaku (he also chose to leave the flock when Kwaku was banished). Kaf first appears in the second book and dies from owl wounds in the third.
- Kwaku is a very small, outcast crow whose feathers are all askew. He is, for the most part, quiet and introverted. He often has cryptic visions which often warn of some danger or challenge ahead. however he has no control over these visions. Kyf describes these visions as the Maker whispering in his ear. The others cannot agree as to what to make of Kwaku. But Kwaku proves to be kind, intelligent and brave.
- Kyrt is the leader of a large group of young, cautionless crows whose elders have all died of the plague. Kyp takes over leadership of the flock to some extent, but still respects Kyrt's role. Kyrt himself is respectful and not particularly unintelligent or unkind. He first appears in the second book and continues to flock with Kyp throughout the rest of the series.
- Kort (ru Kemna) is a "thin, retiring crow" who alerts Kyp of the Plague and Kym's disappearance. He also guides him to the dying Kalum.
- The Urkana, meaning, "Where the Wind Chooses", are a massive group of crows that Kyp's flock flies to in the hopes that, with the Urkana on their side, they will be able to defeat the Collection. The members of the Urkana mostly have names beginning with Ur-, unlike the Kinaar who have names beginning with K.
- Kryk is a young crow in The Judgment who has trouble flying with the others. It is revealed later that when he was younger a human captured him and made him call for help so that the human could shoot and kill the crows who came to answer his call. For this, he is Banished from the flock by the Urkana and is later killed by Kuper.
- Kymnyt is a young female crow that appears in the third book. She is a relatively minor character but manages to survive until the end of the book and therefore the end of the series.
- Kuru (ru Kykata ru Kolk) is an elderly crow that appears in the third book. He guides the flock to the Urkana and tries to persuade some of them to join Kyp's flock before Kuper kills him. Throughout the book he is generally regarded as being cantankerous and a nuisance, but before he dies they come to respect him.
- Ur-Ryk (ru UrKarak) is a member of the Urkana who recognizes Kryk and tells all of the crows about what he did, leading to Kryk's banishment from all the flocks.
- Ur-Kwyt (ru Katu ru Kwyt) is the Chooser of the Urkana who breaks up the fight between Ur-Ryk and Kryk before Banishing Kryk. He requires that all crows need permission before they enter and before they leave, and he hates rule-breakers the most of all.
- Kree (ru Kreewyt) is an elder from the Urkana, frail with bad eyes, who joins the Collection and is afterwards never mentioned. However, being an elder, it is assumed that his opinion changed the minds of several Urkana members.
- Ur-Kwanyt (ru Korlu ru Kwu) is the eldest member of the Urkana at thirty-five years, the same age as Kuru. Kuru mentions that he was the most influential crow of the Urkana. When Ur-Kwanyt joins the Urkana, Kuru becomes angered and unleashes a large speech about how horrible Kuper's plan is.

=== Other animals ===
- The Red is a ginger tabby cat that lives by the Gathering Tree. He is responsible for the death of a yearling crow, and so Kyp assembles a mob to kill the Red.
- The Other Cats are four cats with varying names like The Red. In the first book, when some of the crows are hiding underground, the four cats take that as an opportunity to kill some of the crows.
- The Magpie is an unnamed magpie in the third book. It is mentioned she was released from the humans in the second book, but is never individually mentioned. She understands some crow and tells Kyp's flock that there are twice as many crows in the Collection as they thought.

== Plot features ==
=== The Family Kinaar ===
In the novels, the Family Kinaar is divided into six clans, Kemna, Kelk, Koorda, Kurea, Kark, and Kush. Kurea is Kyp's clan and Kemna is Kym's clan. Kyp's full name (Kyp ru Kurea ru Kinaar) Kym's full name (Kym ru Kemna ru Kinnar) states that he is all three of these things. It can be assumed that the Kinaar family is only made up of species living in North American, such as the American crow. Erkala's full name is Erkala ru Erkata ru Eru, but she comes from across the sea and is quite obviously of a different species, and therefore an entirely different clan and family. However, it is stated in the novels that all the crows of this world are descended from Great Crow and his offspring. In the back of The Plague and The Judgment there is a family tree of the family Kinaar, the name Kinaar coming from a crow by the name of Kinaar Wind Rider. The Urkana come from varying clans and families from Kwu to Kwyt. Kuru's family name is Kolk, however he mentions in the Judgment that he has no family anymore.

=== Crow mythology ===
The crows have a rich mythology of stories that they use to explain everything. The Maker is the creator of all, and Great Crow is their ancestor. The beginning of the book will begin with one of these stories, and occasionally chapters in the middle will do the same thing. Sometimes these stories are used in actual speech by the characters in conversation. In The Judgment, Kyp uses the story of The Maker forgiving Great Crow for stealing Sun Eagle to get a band of crows known as the Urkana to forgive a crow named Kryk. Other times it will be used as a symbol for what they are going through. At the end of the third book, Katakata tells us a tale about after Great Crow lost Kaynu Firstmate and the Maker created three new mates for him; he picked the third, a crow, because it bleeds and feels pain but recovers. This was to symbolize how through their journeys they had experienced death and pain, but they had recovered.

== Publication history ==
American and Canadian copies are printed separately from United Kingdom copies, so they have different covers.

=== The Mob ===
Kids Can Press printed the American and Canadian copies of The Mob, hardback in August 2004 and paperback a year later. San Val printed an American library binding edition in September 2005. Bloomsbury Publishing PLC printed the United Kingdom copies of The Mob, hardback and paperback in January 2006, with a reprinting of the paperback in July of the same year. Oakhill Publishing Unlimited produced an audio version of The Mob in July 2007.

=== The Plague ===
Kids Can Press printed the American and Canadian copies of The Plague, hardback in August 2005 and paperback a year later. Bloomsbury Publishing PLC printed the United Kingdom copies of The Plague, paperback only, in January 2007.

=== The Judgment ===
Kids Can Press printed the American and Canadian copies of The Judgment, hardback in August 2006 and paperback in September 2007. Bloomsbury Publishing PLC printed the United Kingdom copies of The Judgment, paperback only, in July 2007.

== Reception ==
=== Reviews ===
The trilogy was optioned early on by the Canadian entertainment company Nelvana, which is known for its children's animation.

==== The Mob ====
The first book got a review of two and a half stars out of four from CM Magazine. The critic praises Clem Martini for his "wonderful command of language" and the "unique and exciting" personalities of the crows within the book. However, he also criticizes the "back-and-forth" foreshadowing and flashbacks, as well as the late introduction of conflict to the novel and late shift of the focus of the story to the three "main" characters. The overall review was stated as "recommended with reservations."

A reviewer for School Library Journal reviewed The Mob and praised its balance of character ages, non-preachiness of values, avian knowledge, humor, and originality, but disapproved of the slow plot and preference of talk over action.

Quill & Quire reviewed The Mob and said that, with the exception of the crows' mythology, the novel read like an imitation of the Silverwing series without the "same magical imaginative spark".

Booklist disapproved of the use of a detached protagonist, specifically an elder with ritual recitations, but praised Martini's ability to "drum up sympathy for main characters generally regarded as unsavory pests".

==== The Plague ====
The second book got a review of three total stars out of four from CM Magazine. The critic praises the author for "seamlessly and successfully integrating crow lore throughout the story." The myths and lore themselves were written in such a way that, according to the critic, "managed to make all the old stories, history, and bits of wisdom seem interesting, relevant, and unobtrusive." In addition, she stated that the book was easy to follow for those that had not read the first. The only flaw that the critic found with the novel was the interesting choice of first person, which she believed gave the novel a very "jarring" effect. Overall the book was recommended.

The reviewer for School Library Journal also reviewed The Plague and was much more negative. This time, they praised the folklore, but had no more positive words. They felt that all of the K names made it too difficult to distinguish the characters, and that there was little character development. They felt that the plague was just a convenient excuse to jumpstart the story, and that the fire to save Kym was a convenient way to end. They ended with saying that fans of The Mob will enjoy it, but everyone else can pass.

==== The Judgment ====
The third book got a review of two stars out of four from CM Magazine, the lowest of the trilogy. The critic still manages to praise Martini for his "harmonious balance between storytelling, philosophizing, and imparting information about his imaginary crow society", which she says has become better throughout the trilogy. However, the book got the lower rating for the feeling of "something absent", where the critic goes on to state that she did not feel "passionately invested in the fates of the crows while reading The Judgment." Despite the low rating, the book was still recommended by the critic.

=== Awards ===
Year	Book	Award	Result	Reference
2004	The Mob	YA Top Forty Fiction by the Pennsylvania School Librarians Association	Won	
2004	The Mob	Book of the Year Award by ForeWord Magazine	Third	
2005	The Mob	Snow Willow Award by Saskatchewan's Young Readers' Choice	Shortlisted	
2005	The Mob	Red Maple Award by the Ontario Library Association	Shortlisted	
2006	The Mob	Alberta Children's Choice Rocky Mountain Book Award	Shortlisted	
2005	The Plague	Ross Annett Award for Children's Literature	Shortlisted	
2007	The Plague	Red Maple Award by the Ontario Library Association	Shortlisted	

== See also ==
- American crow
- Hooded crow
- Young adult novel
- Anthropomorphism
