= King George Square =

Public square in Brisbane, Queensland

Coordinates: 27°28′6″S 153°1′27″E

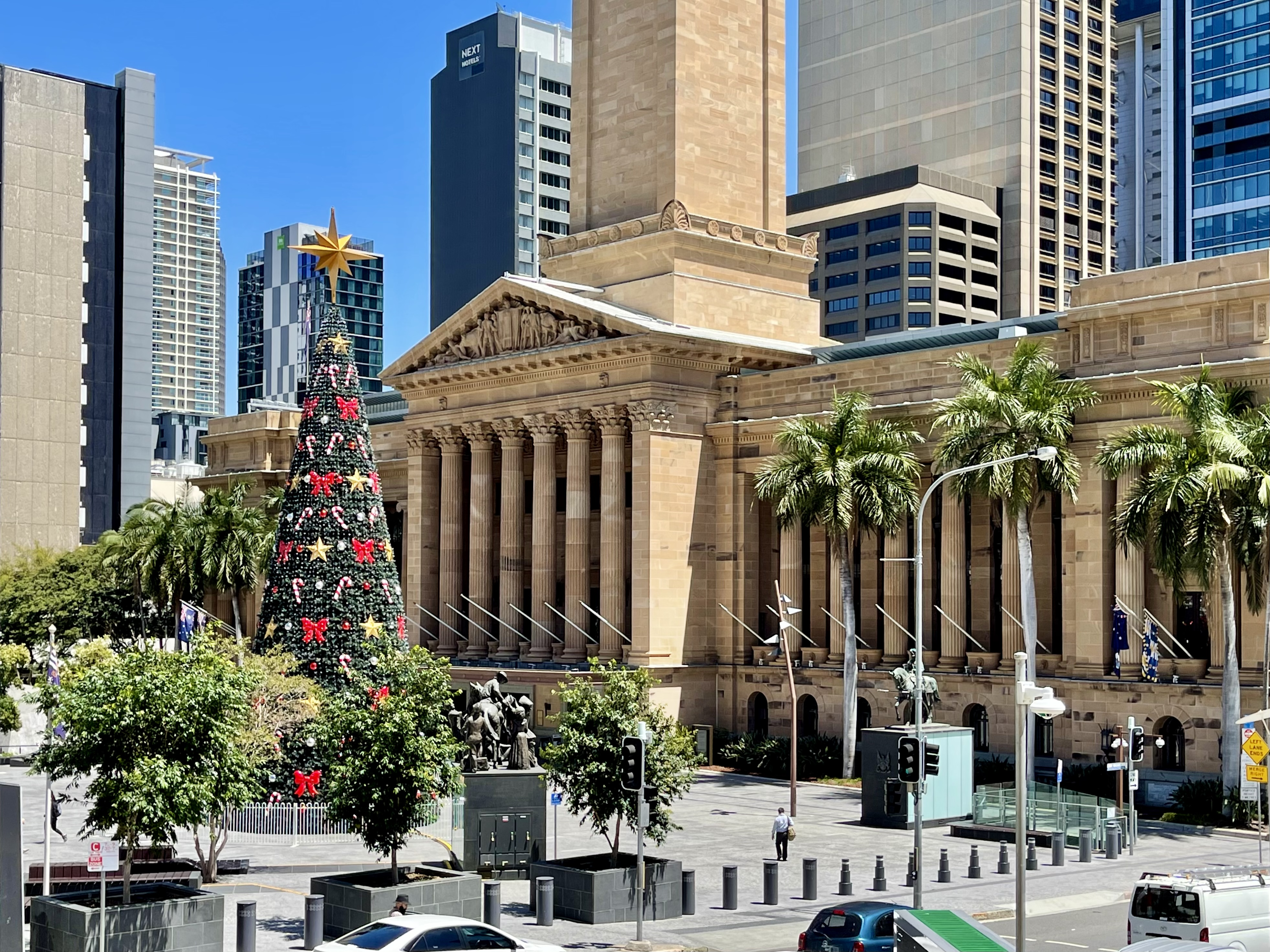
King George Square with Christmas tree in December 2020

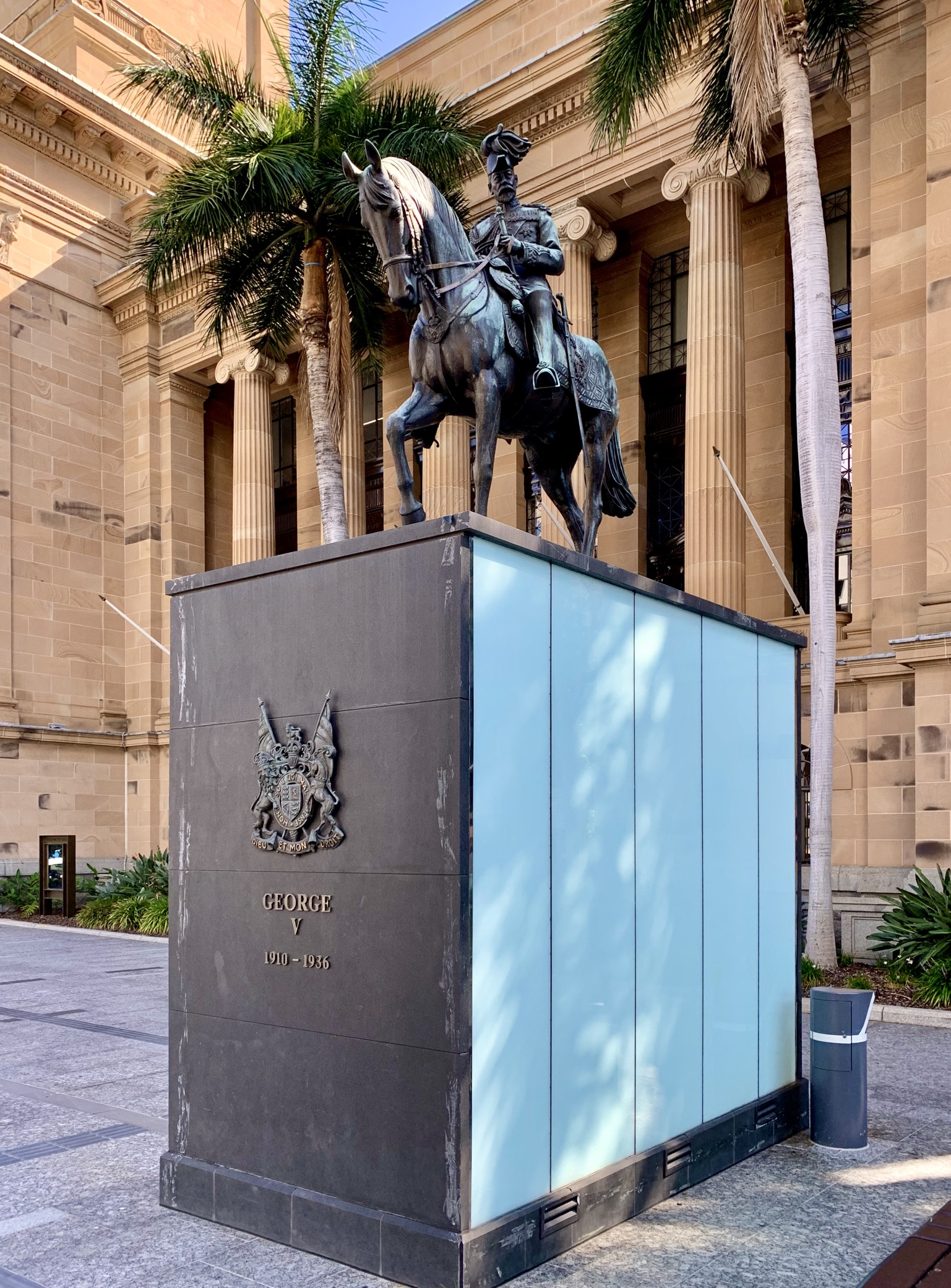
Statue of King George V, after whom the square was named. The statue is in King George Square, in front of Brisbane City Hall.

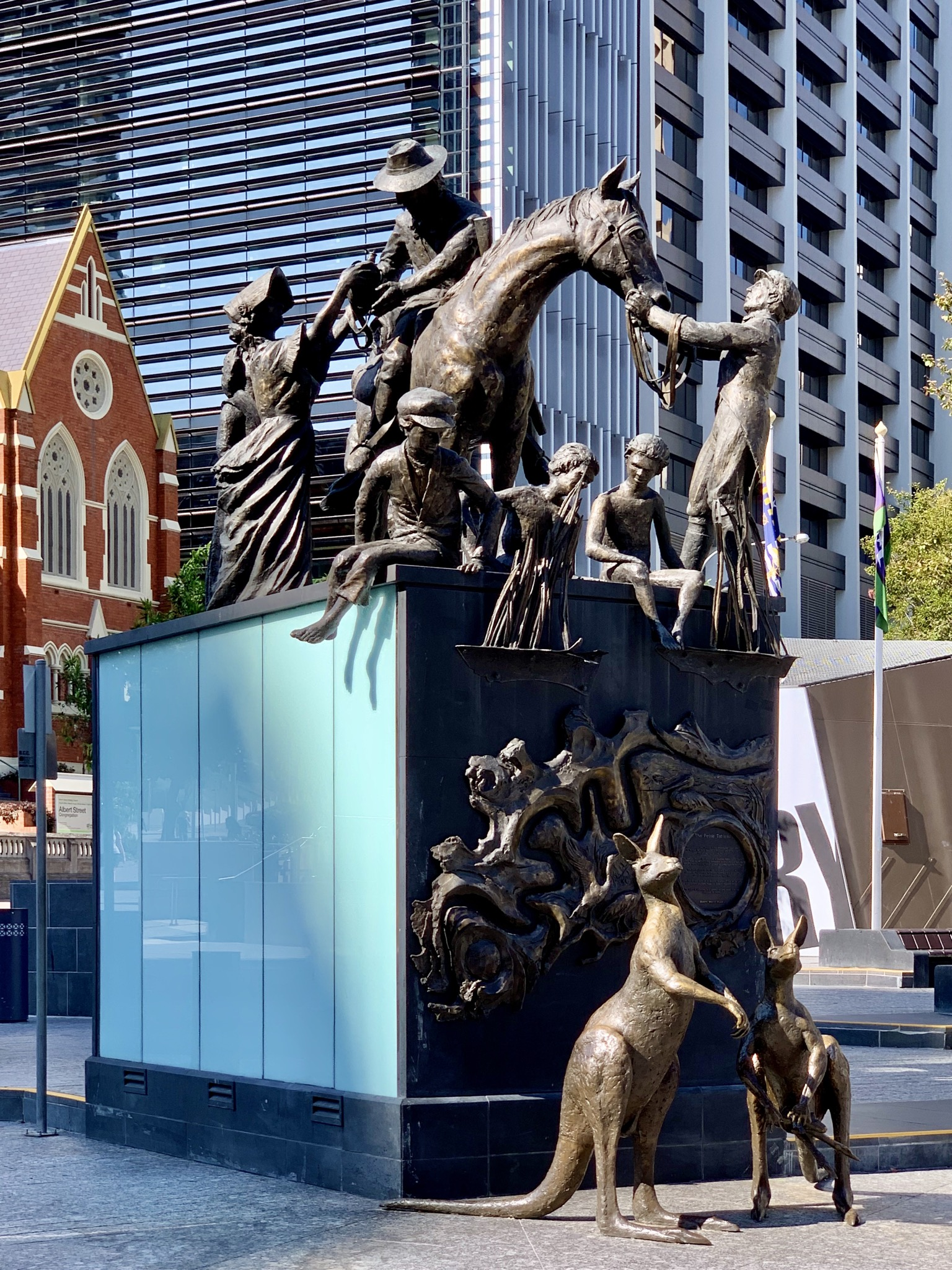
Petrie Tableau sculpture

King George Square is a public square located between Adelaide Street and Ann Street (and between two sections of Albert Street) in Brisbane, Queensland, Australia. Brisbane City Hall is adjacent to the square.

On 1 January 2004, King George Square was listed on the Brisbane Heritage Register.

== History ==
=== Albert Square ===
Originally, Albert Street ran west from the Botanic Gardens as far as Ann Street and the original city markets. Market Square was located between Ann Street and Adelaide street, south of Albert Street. This became the site of the Brisbane City Hall, which was completed in 1930. The City Hall was set back from Albert Street and this widened area of Albert Street, and some land north of the street, was renamed Albert Square in honour of Prince Albert, husband of Queen Victoria. The National Library of Australia holds photographs of Albert Square, which pre-date King George Square in its present form. When Albert Square was redeveloped into King George Square, the fountain at Albert Square was relocated to Wynnum.

In 1912, then Albert Square was the site of the 1912 Brisbane general strike. Over 15,000 trade unionists held a march in Market Square after being refused a permit to protest, on the orders of Commissioner Cahill, the police charged and attacked peaceful protesters, in what became known as 'Black Friday'.

=== King George Square ===
Following the death of King George V in 1936, the square was widened to include the area which had been Albert Street, and renamed King George Square in honour of the King. The bronze Lion sculptures, which appear to guard the King George Square entrance to the Brisbane City Hall, were initially on large sandstone plinths, as part of the George V memorial, which was unveiled in 1938, as a tribute to the King from the citizens of Brisbane.

Vehicular traffic, including a trolley-bus route, operated through the square until 1969, when the roadway was closed to traffic. Buildings on the northern side of the square were acquired by the City Council including the Tivoli Theatre and the Hibernian Building and demolished and work commenced on the construction of the underground King George Square Car Park. At the time of the construction, the statues, including that of King George V and the brass lions, were relocated to their present positions in the square and, between the statues and King George Square, there is now a narrow laneway (replacing the former roadway) for the infrequent passage of Government vehicles (or work vehicles) to be driven to the front of the City Hall.

A round-shaped fountain, located in the centre of King George Square, was also demolished, and a rectangular-shaped fountain built. As a direct result of the 2005–07 drought, the water in the rectangular-shaped fountain was temporarily replaced by a special "Watersense garden" with drought-resistant plants.

There are statues of some famous Queenslanders in a special section of King George Square, which is called "Speakers' Corner". The statues are of Steele Rudd (1868–1935), Emma Miller (1839–1917), and Sir Charles Lilley (1830–1897). Bronze sculptures from the Expo '88 site have also been incorporated into the square's design.

=== 2009 redevelopment ===
In October 2009 the new King George Square was opened after 16 months redevelopment. The square's design is by UbrisJHD selected in a national design competition. The square redevelopment followed the conversion of the underground lower two levels of the King George Square Car Park into the King George Square busway station.

The redesign has been heavily criticised for excess surface heat, glare and its lack of grass and shade.

General Strike of 1912

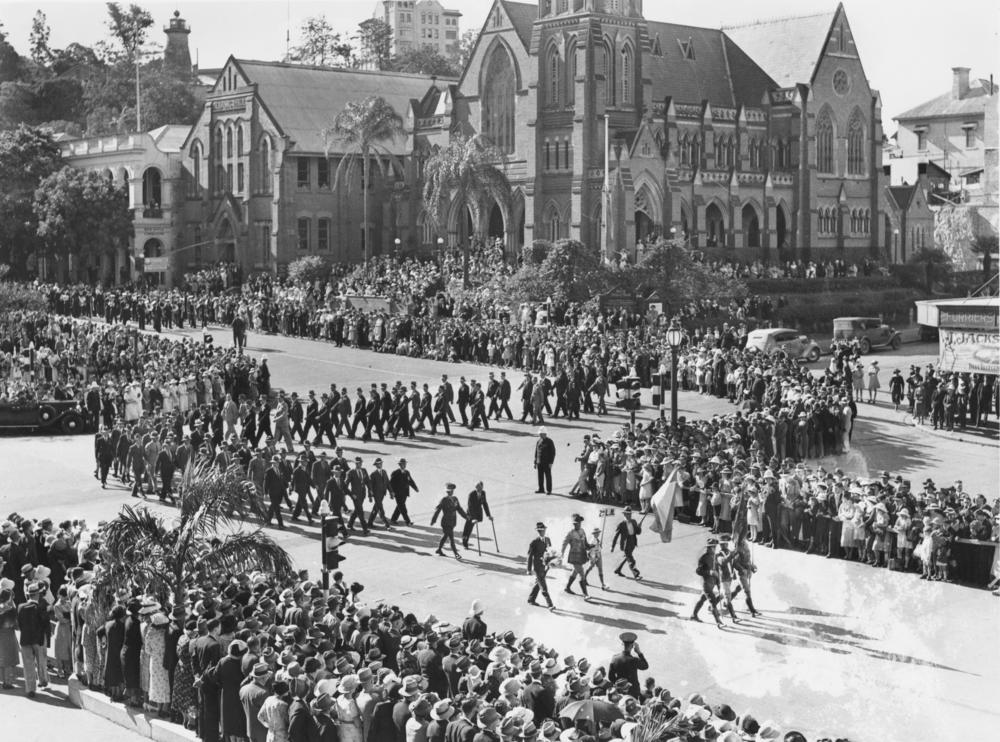
Anzac Day procession through Albert Square, 1937

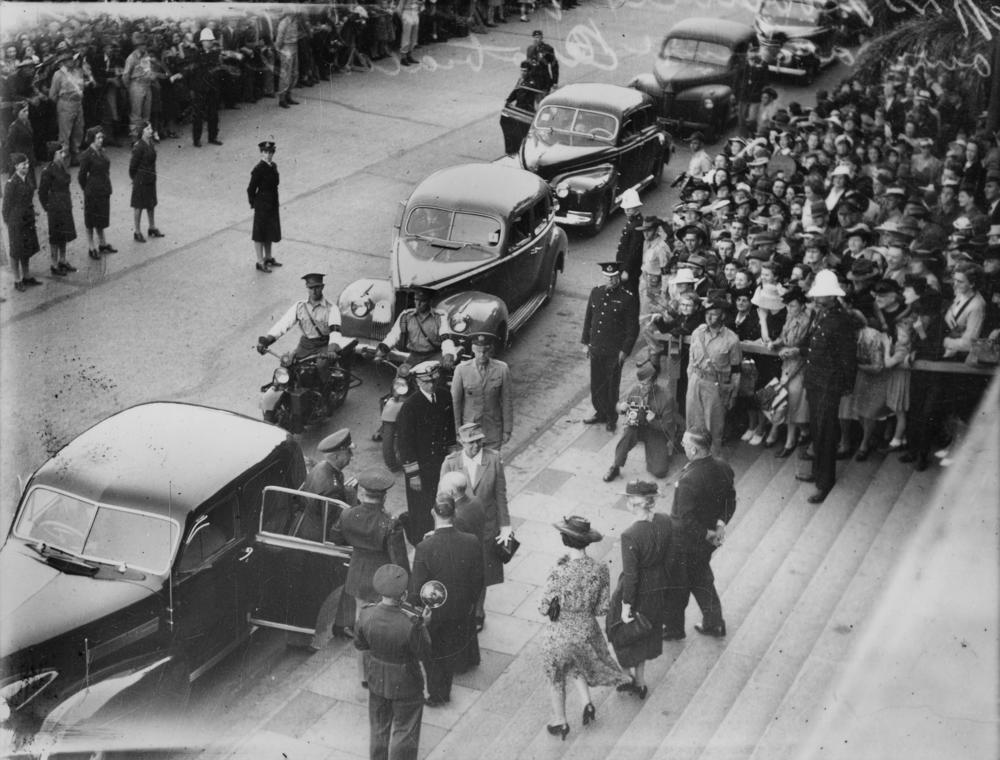
Eleanor Roosevelt in King George Square during World War II, 1943

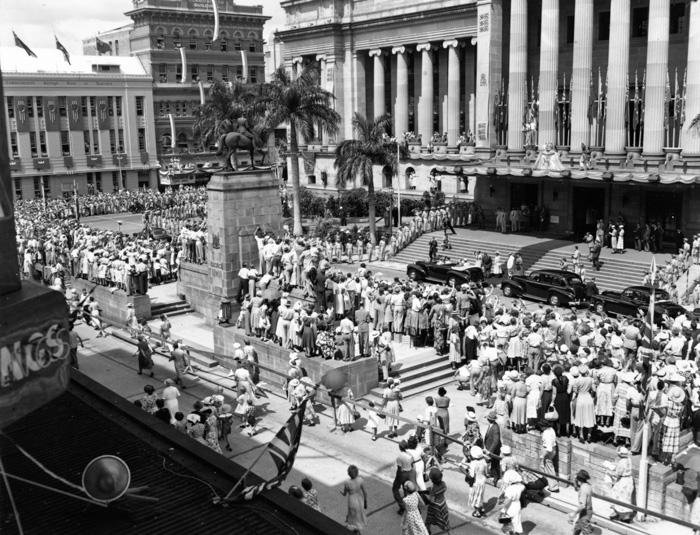
Elizabeth II during her 1954 royal tour

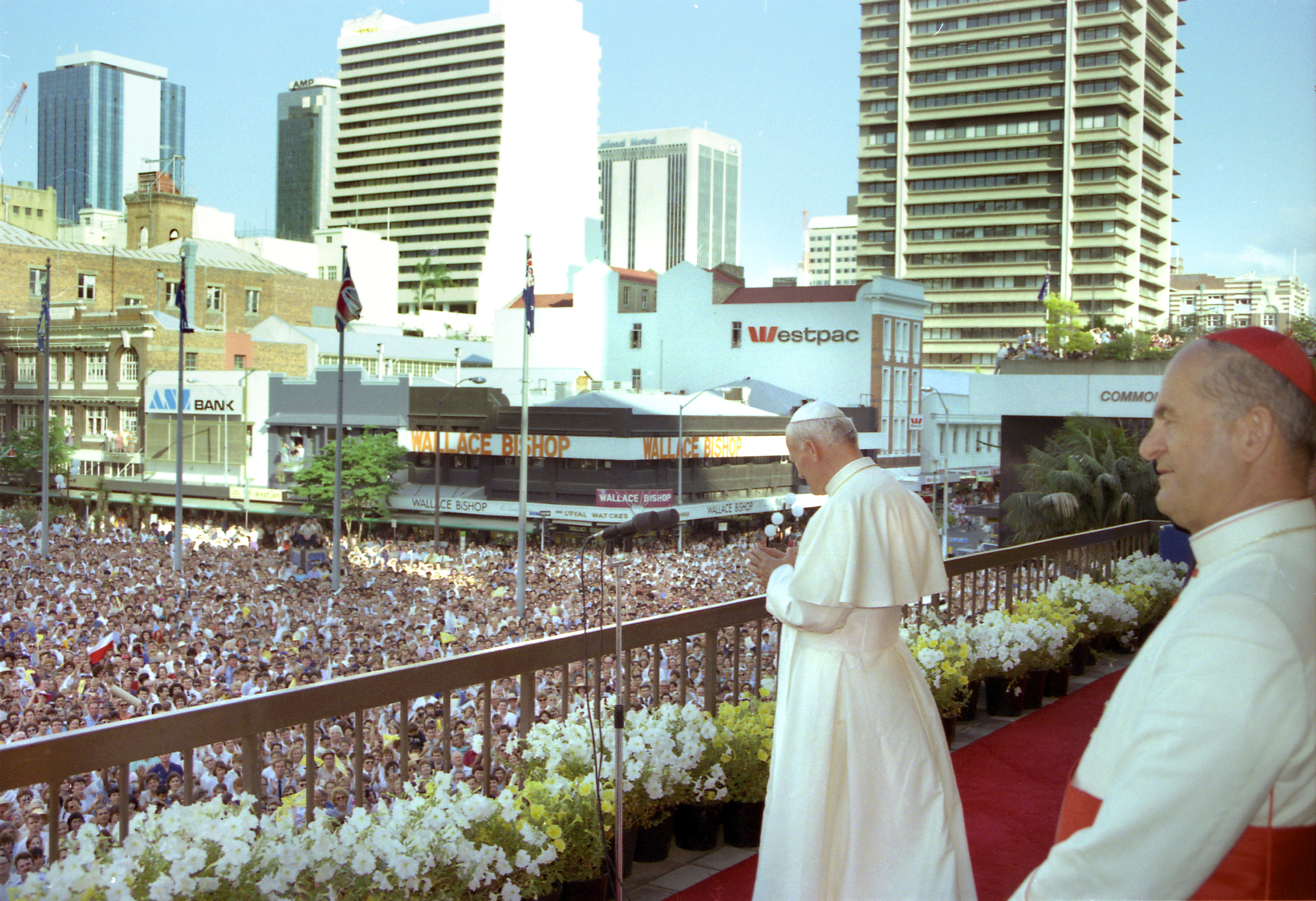
Pope John Paul II addressing the public, 1986

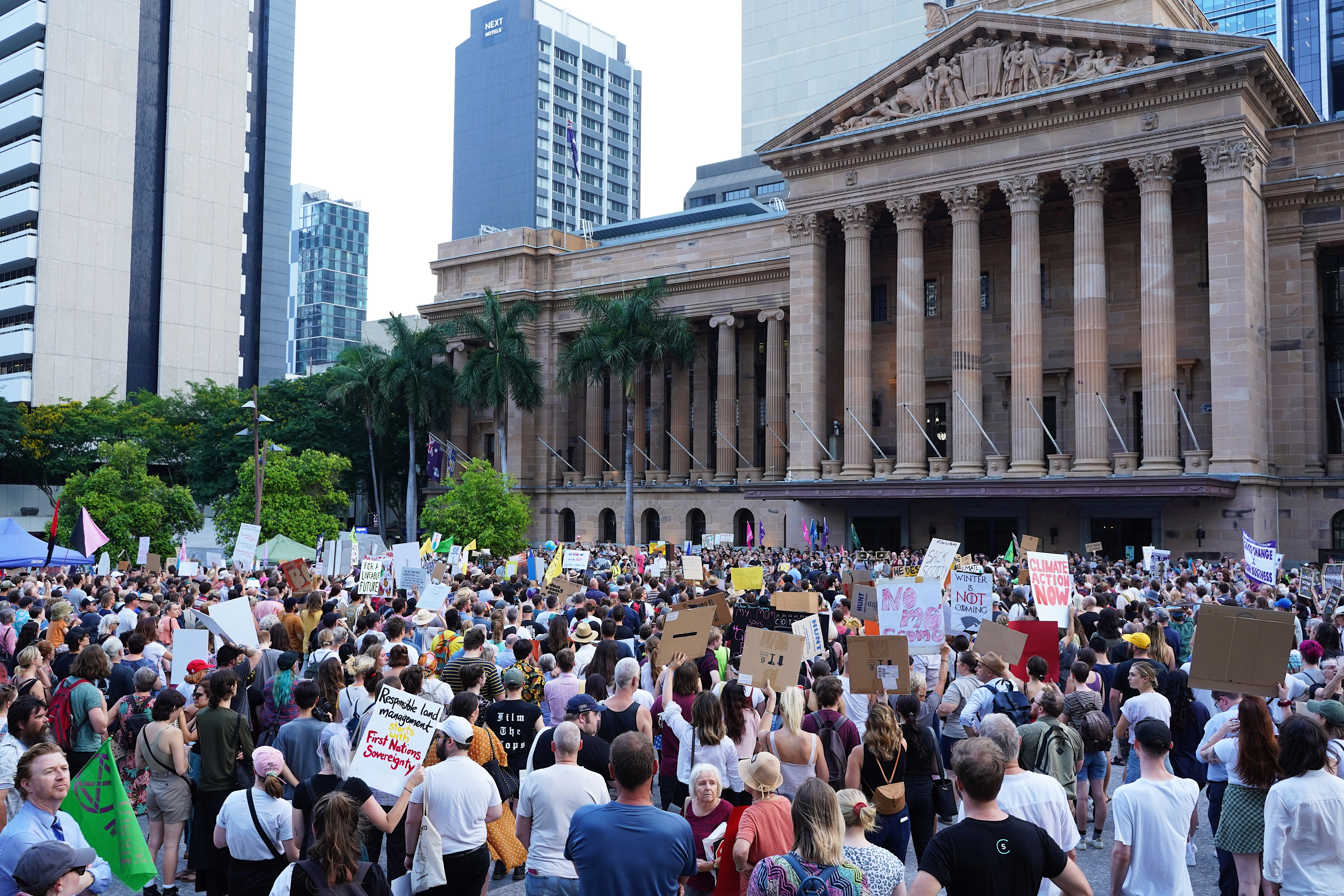
Sack Scomo rally, 2019
