= Thomas Taylor =

Thomas Taylor may refer to:

== Military ==
- Thomas H. Taylor (1825–1901), Confederate States Army colonel
- Thomas Happer Taylor (1934–2017), U.S. Army officer; military historian and author; triathlete
- Thomas Taylor (Medal of Honor) (born 1834), American Civil War sailor and Medal of Honor recipient
- Thomas William Taylor (British Army officer) (1782–1854)

== Politicians ==
- Sir Thomas Taylor, 2nd Baronet, of Park House (1657–1696), English MP for Maidstone
- Sir Thomas Taylor, 1st Baronet (1662–1736), Anglo-Irish MP
- Sir Thomas Taylor, 2nd Baronet, of Kells (1686–1757), Anglo-Irish MP
- Thomas Taylour, 1st Earl of Bective (1724–1795), Irish peer and politician
- Thomas Edward Taylor (1811–1883), British Conservative Party politician
- Thomas Taylor (Liberal politician) (1851–1916), British Liberal Party politician, MP for Bolton, 1912–1916
- Thomas William Taylor (1852–1924), politician in Manitoba, Canada
- Thomas Baird Taylor (1860–1937), American farmer and politician in the Minnesota House of Representatives
- Tommy Taylor (New Zealand politician) (1862–1911), New Zealand Member of Parliament
- Thomas Taylor (Canadian politician) (1865–1947), politician in British Columbia, Canada
- Thomas N. Taylor (1868–1950), Utah businessman and mayor of Provo, Utah
- Thomas Taylor, Baron Taylor of Gryfe (1912–2001), British politician
- Thomas Taylor, Baron Taylor of Blackburn (1929–2016), British life peer
- Thomas C. Taylor (born 1948), American politician in the New Mexico House of Representatives
- Thomas Taylor (Australian politician), member of the New South Wales Legislative Assembly

== Religious ==
- Thomas Fielden Taylor (1879–1937), New Zealand Anglican priest and city missioner
- Thomas Taylor (Archdeacon of Ardagh), 18th-century Anglican priest in Ireland
- Thomas Taylor (historian) (1858–1938), priest, historian and scholar of Celtic culture
- Thomas Taylor (English minister) (1738–1816), English Wesleyan minister and writer
- Thomas Taylor (priest, 1576–1632), English Puritan
- Thomas Taylor (priest, 1757–1808), Archdeacon of Chichester

== Sports ==
- Thomas Taylor (cricketer, born 1753) (1753–1806), English cricketer
- Thomas Taylor (cricketer, born 1823), English cricketer
- Tommy Taylor (Irish footballer), real name Thomas Taylor, Irish international footballer
- Thomas Taylor (rugby league) (1911–1992), rugby league footballer of the 1930s and 1940s for England, Yorkshire, and Castleford
- Thomas Taylor (weightlifter) (born 1899), British Olympic weightlifter
- T. C. Taylor (Thomas Taylor, born 1978), American football coach and player
- Thomas W. Taylor (1899–1975), American ice hockey coach and administrator

== Others ==
- Thomas Taylor (architect) (1777/78–1826), English artist and architect
- Thomas Taylor (Australian architect) (19th century), Brisbane architect, designed the Wenley House
- Thomas Taylor (artist) (born 1973), British children's author and illustrator
- Thomas Taylor (botanist) (1786–1848), botanical author
- Sir Thomas Taylor (chemist) (1895–1953), English chemist and university administrator
- Thomas Taylor (microscopist), Scottish-American plant pathologist and microscopist
- Thomas Glanville Taylor (1804–1848), English astronomer to HEIC, worked at the Madras Observatory
- Thomas Griffith Taylor (1880–1963), geographer and Antarctic explorer
- Sir Thomas Murray Taylor (1897–1962), principal of Aberdeen University
- Thomas Taylor (neoplatonist) (1758–1835), English translator and Neoplatonist
- Sir Thomas Wardlaw Taylor (1833–1917), Canadian lawyer and judge

== See also ==
- Tom Taylor (disambiguation)
- Tommy Taylor (disambiguation)
- Thomas Taylour (disambiguation)
