= John Oliver (disambiguation) =

John Oliver (born 1977) is an English comedian known for his work on The Daily Show and Last Week Tonight.

John Oliver may also refer to:

== Arts ==
- John Oliver (composer) (born 1959), Canadian composer
- John Oliver (conductor) (1939–2018), American conductor and founder of the Tanglewood Festival Chorus
- John Oliver, also known as Gerry Bean (20th century), Canadian actor

== Religion ==
- John Oliver (Archdeacon of Ardagh) (died 1778)
- John Oliver (Archdeacon of Leeds) (1939–2021)
- John Oliver (bishop) (born 1935), former Bishop of Hereford
- John Oliver (Dean of Christ Church) (died 1552), Anglican priest
- John Oliver (Dean of Worcester) (1601–1661), Anglican priest

== Sports ==
- John Oliver (canoeist) (born 1943), British sprint canoer
- John Oliver (cricketer) (1918–1992), English cricketer
- John Oliver (footballer, born 1867) (1867–?), English footballer who played in the 1880s, and 1890s
- John Oliver (footballer, born 1913) (1913–1991), English footballer of the 1930s
- John Oliver (speedway rider) (born 1987), Australian speedway rider
- John Henry Oliver (1906–1976), American baseball player
- John Oliver (sprinter) (born 1940), Welsh sprinter

== Politics ==
- John Oliver (British Columbia politician) (1856–1927), Canadian politician and former Premier of British Columbia
- John Oliver (Ontario politician) (born 1956), Canadian politician

== Others ==
- Jack Oliver (scientist) (John Ertle Oliver, 1923–2011), American scientist
- John Dudley Oliver (1834–1909), British Army general and Commandant of the Royal Military College, Canada
- John Morrison Oliver (1828–1872), American general in the U.S. Civil War
- John Rathbone Oliver (1872–1943), American psychiatrist, medical historian, author, and priest
- John Watkins Oliver (1914–1990), American federal judge
- "Jonny Oliver", a character performed by Munya Chawawa

== See also ==
- Jon Oliva (born 1959), lead vocalist for Savatage
- Jack Oliver (disambiguation)
- John Olver (disambiguation)
