= List of Chelsea people =

This is a list of notable residents and former residents of the London, England borough of Chelsea.

- David Armstrong-Jones, 2nd Earl of Snowdon
- Anne of Cleves died Chelsea Manor 1557
- Francis Bacon, 1st Viscount St Alban
- Hilaire Belloc (Cheyne Walk)
- John Betjeman (Radnor Walk)
- Honor Blackman (Markham Square)
- Enid Blyton (Beaufort Street)
- Dirk Bogarde (Lower Sloane Street)
- William Boyd
- Marc Isambard Brunel and Isambard Kingdom Brunel (civil engineers); 98 Cheyne Walk
- Charles Cadogan, 8th Earl Cadogan
- Phyllis Calvert (actress) was born in Chelsea
- Catherine, Princess of Wales (Wife of Prince William) (Old Church Street)
- Pavlos, Crown Prince of Greece (Cheyne Walk)
- Thomas Carlyle the "Sage of Chelsea" (24 Cheyne Row – now National Trust House)
- Christian the lion
- Dame Agatha Christie
- Eric Clapton (lived on King's Road during the late 1960s)
- Petula Clark (lived at 4 Royal Avenue in the 1980s)
- Steve Clark (Spent the last few months of his life there while on a 6-month leave of absence from Def Leppard until his death on 8 January 1991.)
- Steve Coogan used to live in the area in the 1990s.
- Frank Cadogan Cowper, artist
- Thomas Crapper (plumbing supplies) (King's Road)
- John de Salis, at 12 First Street and then 28 Upper Cheyne Row (1970s and early 1980s)
- Quentin Crisp (Beaufort Street)
- George Devine & Jocelyn Herbert (Rossetti Studios, Flood Street)
- Charles Ejogo (born 1976), entrepreneur
- George Eliot (spent the last 3 weeks of her life at 4 Cheyne Walk)
- T. S. Eliot (19 Carlyle Mansions, Chelsea Embankment)
- Mary, Dowager Viscountess Fane (No. 2, Swan Walk)
- Rosalind Franklin
- John Fraser (botanist) (Paradise Row)
- Fredo, British rapper
- Judy Garland (spent the last few months of her life there with her fifth husband until death on 22 June 1969)
- Ava Gardner, the Hollywood actress spent the last twenty years of her life here, until her death in 1990
- Robert Gascoyne-Cecil, 7th Marquess of Salisbury (Swan Walk)
- Hugh Magnus MacLeod, 30th Chief of Clan MacLeod (Royal Hospital Road)
- Elizabeth Gaskell (93 Cheyne Walk)
- Margaret Green, painter (Elm Park Gardens and Lucan Place)
- Joyce Grenfell (King's Road from 1945-57 and Elm Park Gardens from 1957-79)
- Adelaide Hall, jazz singer and entertainer lived at 74 Drayton Gardens with her husband Bert Hicks. Shirley MacLaine was a neighbour and very friendly with the Hicks.
- James Hamilton, 1st Duke of Hamilton Royalist General, owned Chelsea Place, his London residence from 1638 until his execution.
- James Edmund Harting, ornithologist, born 1841 in Chelsea
- Herbert Hughes (musician) (Old Church Street)
- Michael Hutchence (Redburn Street)
- Mick Jagger and all the Rolling Stones (Edith Grove, Cheyne Walk)
- Henry James (21 Cheyne Walk)
- Rory Jennings, (actor, presenter) starred in British television program EastEnders
- Jerome K. Jerome (Flat 104, Chelsea Gardens, Chelsea Bridge Road)
- William Jones, 18th century wine merchant and naturalist
- Henry George Kendall Ship Captain of the RMS Empress of Ireland.
- Roger Keyes
- Jiah Khan (born Nafisa Khan, a British actress who appeared in Bollywood films)
- Letitia Elizabeth Landon, poet and novelist. (Hans Place)
- Sir William Arbuthnot Lane, 1st Baronet and Lady Frittie Arbuthnot Lane lived at 72 Drayton Gardens (next door to Adelaide Hall).
- David Lloyd George (10 Cheyne Walk)
- Harold Macmillan, prime minister of the United Kingdom from 1957 to 1963, was born there in 1894.
- Bob Marley composed his hit "I Shot the Sheriff" in a one-bedroom flat off Cheyne Walk in the mid-1970s. 42 Oakley Street
- Gavin Maxwell, novelist, journalist, explorer and author of Ring of Bright Water (9 Paultons Square)
- Arthur Meaby, engineer and a volunteer for the Youth Hostels Association
- Naomi Mitchison, novelist. (17 Cheyne Walk)
- A. A. Milne, playwright and author of Winnie-the-Pooh, lived at 13 (formerly 11) Mallord Street.
- Kylie Minogue (singer, songwriter, actress)
- Nick Kamen, singer, model. (Kings Road)
- Florence Montgomery Novelist and children's writer
- Sir Thomas More Lawyer, philosopher, author, statesman and Renaissance humanist
- John Camden Neild (5 Cheyne Walk)
- Annabelle Neilson, socialite, lived and died 2 Oakley Gardens
- John O'Hara American novelist, author of BUtterfield 8 (novel)
- Sir Laurence Olivier and Vivien Leigh
- Sylvia Pankhurst (Cheyne Walk)
- Sir Eduardo Paolozzi (artist & sculptor)
- Ramsay Weston Phipps (military historian. 21 Carlyle Square)
- Suzelle Poole, English ballerina
- Cyril Power (artist and architect) (16 Redcliffe Street)
- Katharine Susannah Prichard, novelist, communist. (Flat 64, Chelsea Gardens, Chelsea Bridge Road)
- Mary Quant (King's Road and Markham Square)
- Carol Reed (King's Road)
- Nick Rhodes, keyboardist and songwriter of Duran Duran.
- Dante Gabriel Rossetti (16 Cheyne Walk)
- Tony Selby, actor
- John Shaw Jr., architect of the 19th century
- Mary Shelley author of Frankenstein
- Osbert Sitwell (Carlyle Square)
- George Smiley (9 Bywater Street) Fictional Character
- Ned Sherrin, broadcaster, writer. (3 Bywater Street. Died at 4 Cornwall Mansions, Ashburnham Road)
- Dame Maggie Smith (actress)
- Chris Squire
- Philip Wilson Steer (109 Cheyne Walk)
- Bram Stoker (author of Dracula)
- Algernon Charles Swinburne (16 Cheyne Walk)
- Thomas Fielden Taylor, New Zealand Anglican priest and city missioner
- Wilfred Thesiger (Tite Street)
- Gordon Thorne (first-class cricketer and British Army officer)
- J. R. R. Tolkien (Author of The Lord of the Rings)
- J. M. W. Turner (died at 119 Cheyne Walk on 19 December 1851)
- Mark Twain (23 Tedworth Square)
- James Webb painter/artist
- Mary Wesley Novelist, author of The Camomile Lawn. (31 & 39 Smith Street)
- James McNeill Whistler (21, 96 & 101 Cheyne Walk)
- Eric Whitacre (American composer and conductor)
- Oscar Wilde (today 34 Tite Street, 16 Tite Street in Wilde's lifetime)
- Thomas Young, recipient of the Victoria Cross
- Count Nicolaus Zinzendorf, founder of the Moravian Church, Lindsey House
