= Frank Atha Westbury =

Australian novelist

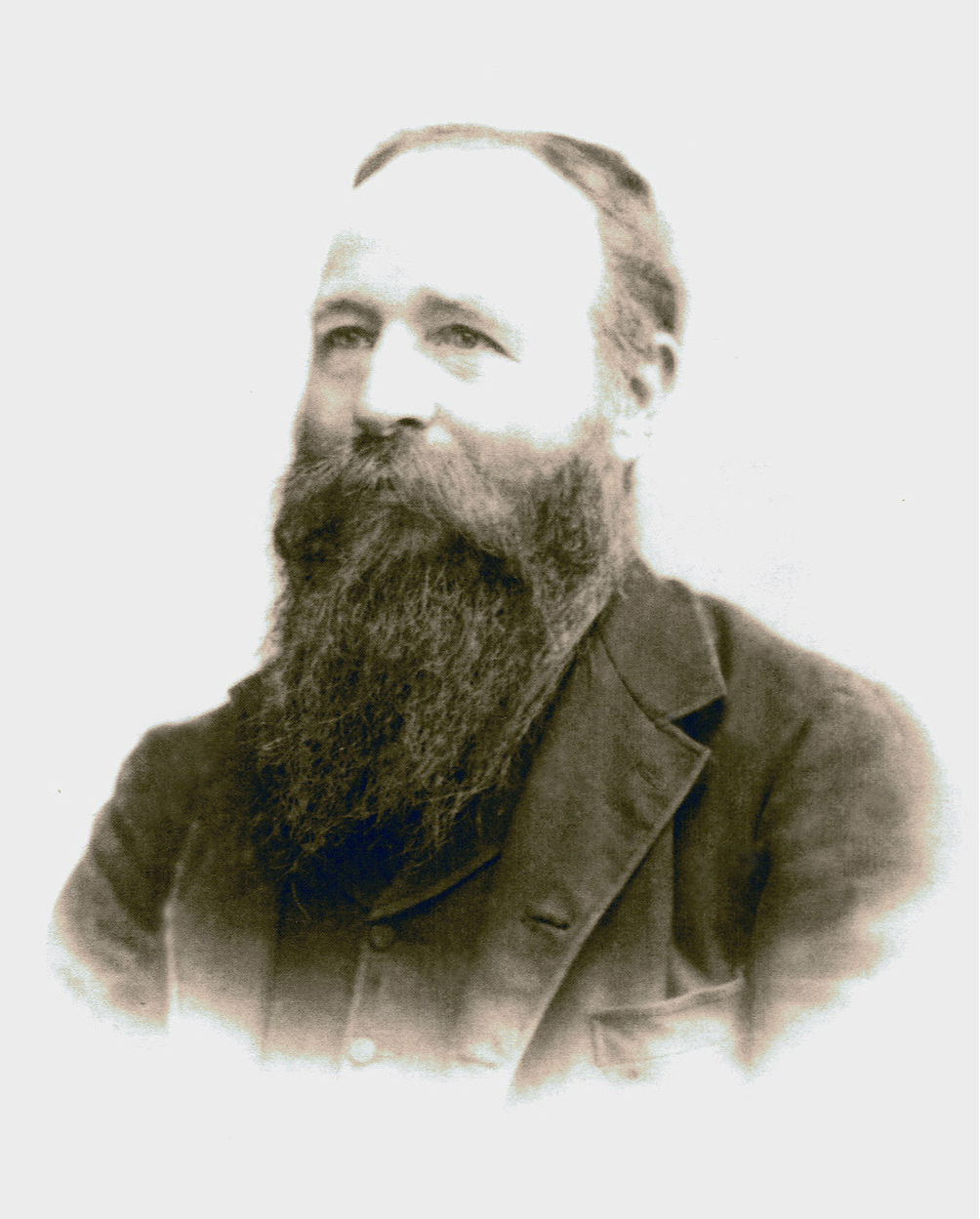
- Frank Atha Westbury, 1890
- Born: James Bleasby; 5 May 1838; Hunslet, Leeds, England
- Died: 24 September 1901 (aged 63); Hawthorn, Melbourne, Victoria, Australia
- Occupations: Writer, poet
- Writing career
- Pen name: Atha; Atha Westbury
- Language: English
- Years active: c. 1879–1905
- Genres: Adventure fiction, mystery, children's literature, poetry
- Notable works: The Shadow of Hilton Fernbrook (1896); Australian Fairy Tales (1897)
- Military career
- Allegiance: United Kingdom
- Branch: British Army
- Service years: c. 1854–1866
- Unit: 68th (Durham) Regiment of Foot
- Conflicts: Crimean War; Second Taranaki War

Frank Atha Westbury (5 May 1838 – 24 September 1901), who wrote under the pen names of "Atha" and "Atha Westbury", was a popular and prolific author of mystery adventure novels, children's stories and poetry in late 19th century Australia and New Zealand. Most of his fiction was serialised in newspapers and journals between 1879 and 1905. His two major works were: The Shadow of Hilton Fernbrook, A Romance of Maoriland (1896) and Australian Fairy Tales (1897), which won him a place as one of the better-known writers for children in Victorian-era Australia. Many of his novels were adventure romances set in New Zealand at the time of the New Zealand Wars of the 1860s, which the author experienced as a soldier in the British Army.

== Biography ==
Frank Westbury was born under the name James Bleasby in Hunslet, an industrial suburb of Leeds, England on 5 May 1838. His mother was Martha Bleasby and his father was a weaver from Holbeck named Benjamin Atha. He grew up in the home of his grandfather, William Bleasby and might have attended Tadcaster Grammar School near Leeds, under a scholarship. At the age of 16, he enlisted in the British Army's 68th (Durham) Regiment of Foot serving in the Crimea, Burma and New Zealand during the Second Taranaki War (1863–66). During this last deployment, he fought in the Battle of Gate Pa, which resulted in major losses for the British. He later claimed that he filed reports on the New Zealand Wars for The Manchester Guardian. After his discharge from the Army in 1866, he went to Melbourne, Australia where he adopted the name Frank Atha Westbury and continued honing his writing skills. There he fell in with a literary crowd that included the poets, Henry Kendall, George Gordon McCrae and Adam Lindsay Gordon, as well as Marcus Clarke, author of the Australian classic novel, For the Term of His Natural Life. He married three times in Australia and had six children, although three died in infancy.

Apart from his career as an author, Westbury also worked as a clerk in Sydney, a secretary for Melbourne's Homeopathic Hospital and as a land agent in Adelaide, where he became friends with George Loyau, the influential editor of The Pictorial Australian, who published much of his work. He spent the last decade of his life in Hawthorn, Melbourne and died of a stroke on 24 September 1901. He was 63.^{1}

== Themes and influences in his work ==
Westbury's poetry was Romantic in style while his fiction writing appears to have drawn inspiration from popular 19th-century romances as well as mystery adventure novels, particularly those of Alexandre Dumas. His best known book, The Shadow of Hilton Fernbrook, is the tale of a murderer who assumes the identity of a wealthy New Zealander in order to steal his estate and escape justice. Set in New Zealand, Venice and London, it has much intrigue and double dealing and features a sinister French "mesmerist" (hypnotist) named Gaston de Roal.^{2} The novel was well received at its time of publication. A review in the Adelaide Advertiser of January 1897 stated: "The Shadow of Hilton Fernbrook is...an admirable story of adventure of the fin de siècle kind. There is villainy enough to supply more than a dozen sensational novels. Mr Westbury handles his perhaps too abundant material with the deftness of an old hand and is equally at home when the sensation of the moment is an exhibition of hypnotism, a description of the New Zealand Wars or an earthquake".^{3}

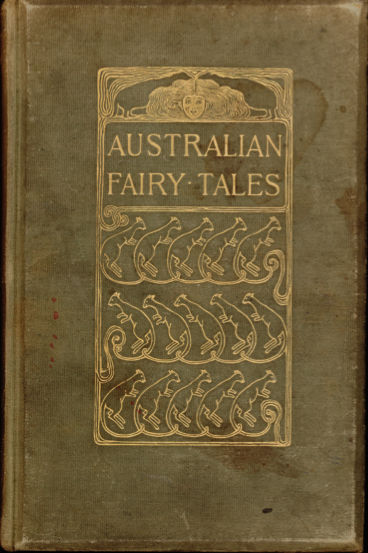
Australian Fairy Tales, 1897

Much of Westbury's writing explores the quest for justice and is often in sympathy with the indigenous New Zealanders, the Maori. As the Adelaide reviewer noted: "Mr Westbury has evidently a liking for the natives... and pictures them as both physically and mentally, a magnificent race... He shows that in the contrast between barbarism and civilisation the advantages are not all on the one side. Te Coro, the Maori girl, is a more than presentable heroine and the author proves by more than one example a distinct gift of characterisation".^{4}

He also wrote extensively for children. Australian Elves, published by the Pictorial Australian in 1885 and Australian Fairy Tales (Ward Lock & Co London, 1897) were among the first to utilise the Australian landscape as the setting for fairy stories, a device that initially received mixed reactions from critics. As one reviewer in the Sydney Morning Herald remarked wryly in 1897: "One feels puzzled to meet brownie, kobold, gnome, dwarf and prince under our skies. Perhaps their small Highnesses, whose age is under double figures, may approve".^{5} Most of his fairy tales were about young men who started out in poverty but found riches through the intervention of a princess or magical being.

In the 1890s, novels, short stories and poems by Atha Westbury were to be found serialised in city and regional newspapers as well as literary journals across Australia and New Zealand and as far away as England. A large number of these works were set in New Zealand and featured themes of mystery, adventure, war, crime and justice, the occult, mesmerism and romance. Another favourite theme was that of the prodigal son: the struggle of a disgraced scion of a well-to-do family to redeem himself in society and his father's eyes. Both The Shadow of Hilton Fernbrook and Australian Fairy Tales were republished in 2009 and 2010.

== Major published works ==
- Mater Familias. Poetry. Quiz, Adelaide, South Australia, 10 March 1905.
- The Prodigal of Glencourt. Novel. Serialised in The Camperdown Chronicle, Melbourne, Australia, July–September 1901.
- The Expiation of Claude Wingate. Novel. The Australian Journal, Melbourne. Published in serialised form, August 1899 – January 1900.
- Australian Fairy Tales. Collected stories. London, England. Ward, Lock & Co., 1897.
- The Shadow of Hilton Fernbrook: A Romance of Maoriland. Novel. London, England Chatto & Windus, 1896; published in the United States by New Amsterdam Book Company, New York, 1902. (originally serialised as The Mystery of Fernbrook in Frearson's Monthly Illustrated Adelaide News and The Pictorial Australian 1884–1886)
- Fifty Lashes. Short Story. The West Australian Newspaper, Perth, March 1895.
- De Profundis. Short story. The Australian Journal, Melbourne, Vol.28 no.335, April 1893.
- Maoriland Ho. Nature’s Enchanting Wonder Isle. Novel. Serialised in The Camperdown Chronicle, Melbourne, 1893.
- Paul Cranbourne's Wedding: A Christmas Story. The Australian Journal, Melbourne, Vol.28 no.331 December 1892
- Fire. Short Story. Northern Territory Times and Gazette, Darwin, 29 December 1888
- 'Gainst Wind and Tide. Short Story. Published in serialised form in Once a Week, London, November 1887 – February 1888.
- Talbot Fane, Bachelor. Novel. Serialised in the literary supplement to the Pictorial Australian, Adelaide, Christmas 1885 – November 1886.
- At the Threshold. Short Story. Frearson's Monthly Illustrated Adelaide News, Adelaide, S.A., February 1884.
- Dawn and Noon. Poetry. Frearson's Monthly Illustrated Adelaide News, March 1884.
- Trust. Poetry. The Leader, Melbourne, 18 January 1879.
- In The Pictorial Australian, Adelaide "Atha" was also listed as the author of 'Living or Dead', 'Other People's Money', 'Brandon Westlake', 'Maoris and Pakehas', 'Australian Elves', 'Puck Piermont', 'Kiorani' and 'Gadabout Papers' (dates of publication uncertain).

== Notes ==
1.For biographical information as well as listings of his work, see Frank Atha Westbury, from AustLit, the Australian Literature Resource. http://www.austlit.edu.au
2.The Shadow of Hilton Fernbrook: A Romance of Maoriland. London, England, Chatto & Windus, 1896.
3.Review of The Shadow of Hilton Fernbrook in The Advertiser, Adelaide, Sth. Australia, 1 January 1897, p. 6.
4.Review of The Shadow of Hilton Fernbrook in The Advertiser, Adelaide, Sth. Australia, 1 January 1897, p. 6.
5.Review of Australian Fairy Tales from The Sydney Morning Herald, Sydney, Australia, 6 Nov. 1897, p. 4.
