= 1943 Navy Midshipmen men's soccer team =

American college soccer season

1943 Navy Midshipmen men's soccer

National co-champions (ISFA/NSCAA)
- Conference: Independent
- Record: 6–0–1
- Head coach: Tom Taylor (23rd season)
- Home stadium: Thompson Stadium

The 1943 Navy Midshipmen men's soccer team represented the United States Naval Academy during the 1943 ISFA season. It was the program's 23rd season of existence.

The 1943 season saw Navy win their second ever national championship, the ISFA national championship. The title was shared with the Rensselaer Polytechnic Institute. The program was coached by former Olympic gold medalist, Tom Taylor who had been coaching the program since its inception.

Due to World War II, the season was cut dramatically short, as the program only played fixtures from mid-October until late-November 1943.

== Schedule ==
Date Time, TV	Rank^{#}	Opponent^{#}	Result	Record	Site City, State
Regular Season
10-13-1943*		Duke	W 7–0	1–0–0	Thompson Stadium; Annapolis, MD
10-23-1943*		at Penn	W 3–1	2–0–0	Franklin Field; Philadelphia, PA
10-24-1943*		Lehigh	W 4–0	3–0–0	Thompson Stadium; Annapolis, MD
11-06-1943*		Penn State	T 2–2	3–0–1	Thompson Stadium; Annapolis, MD
11-10-1943*		Swarthmore	W 5–1	4–0–1	Thompson Stadium; Annapolis, MD
11-20-1943*		Bucknell	W 7–0	5–0–1	Thompson Stadium; Annapolis, MD
11-25-1943*		Army; Army–Navy Cup	W 3–1	6–0–1	Thompson Stadium (1,000); Annapolis, MD
*Non-conference game. ^{#}Rankings from United Soccer Coaches. (#) Tournament seedings in parentheses.

== All-Americans ==
The following players were named All-Americans by ISFA.

- Samuel Gorsline, GK
- George Reaves, LB
- William Chaires, CM
- Arturo Calisto, CF
