= Andrew Charlton (disambiguation) =

Andrew Charlton (born 1979) is an Australian economist and politician.

Andrew Charlton may also refer to:

- Andrew Charlton (priest) (c. 1600s), Irish Anglican priest
- Boy Charlton (Andrew Murray Charlton, 1907–1975), Australian freestyle swimmer

== See also ==
- Andrew Carlton (born 1977), American singer, songwriter and music producer
- Andrew Carleton (born 2000), American professional soccer player
