= Charles Trench =

Charles Trench may refer to:

- Charles Chenevix Trench (1914–2003), Anglo-Indian army officer, historian and writer
- Charles Le Poer Trench (died 1839), Anglican archdeacon in Ireland
