= Tommy Taylor (disambiguation) =

Tommy Taylor (1932–1958) was an English international footballer who played for Barnsley and Manchester United.

Tommy Taylor may also refer to:

- Tommy Taylor (baseball) (1892–1956), Major League Baseball player
- Tommy Taylor (footballer, born 1903) (1903–1978), English footballer who played for Southampton
- Tommy Taylor (Irish footballer), Irish international footballer
- Tommy Taylor (footballer, born 1951), English footballer who played for Leyton Orient and West Ham United
- Tommy Taylor (New Zealand politician) (1862–1911), New Zealand politician
- Tommy Taylor (Mississippi politician) (born 1948), American politician in the Mississippi House of Representatives
- Tommy Taylor (rugby league) (1911–1992), English rugby league footballer
- Tommy Taylor (rugby union) (born 1991), rugby union player
- Tommy Taylor (athlete), British Paralympic gold medal winner
- Tommy Taylor (wrestler) (born 1986), English wrestler
- Tommy Taylor (musician) (born 1957), drummer
- J. Thomas Taylor (1889–1966), known as Tommy, American horse trainer

== See also ==
- Thomas Taylor (disambiguation)
- Tom Taylor (disambiguation)
