= Thomas Taylour =

Thomas Taylour may refer to:

- Thomas Taylour, 1st Earl of Bective (1724–1795), Irish MP for Kells 1747–1760
- Thomas Taylour, 1st Marquess of Headfort (1757–1829), his son, Irish MP for Kells 1776–1790, Longford Borough and Meath
- Thomas Taylour, 2nd Marquess of Headfort (1787–1870), his son, Lord-in-Waiting and Lord Lieutenant of Cavan
- Thomas Taylour, 3rd Marquess of Headfort (1822–1894), British MP for Westmorland 1854–1870, Lord Lieutenant of Meath
- Thomas Taylour, Earl of Bective (1894–1943), British MP for Westmorland 1871–1885 and Kendal

== See also ==
- Thomas Taylor (disambiguation)
- Thomas le Tayleur, MP for Wycombe (UK Parliament constituency)
