= Tom Taylor =

Tom Taylor may refer to:

- Tom Taylor (actor) (born 2001), English actor known for role in The Dark Tower
- Tom Taylor (American football) (born 1962), American football guard
- Tom Taylor, Baron Taylor of Blackburn (1929–2016), UK Labour politician
- Tom Taylor (dramatist) (1817–1880), British dramatist and editor of Punch magazine
- Tom Taylor (sculptor) (1925–1994), New Zealand sculptor and educator
- Tom Taylor (billiards player), World Professional Billiards Championship runner-up
- Tom Taylor (cricketer, born 1994), English cricketer for Derbyshire and Leicestershire
- Tom Taylor (footballer, born 1985), English footballer
- Tom Taylor (footballer, born 2005), English footballer
- Tom Taylor (Glamorgan cricketer) (1911–1970), Welsh cricketer
- Tom Taylor (Hampshire cricketer) (1753–1806), English cricketer
- Tom Taylor (Georgia politician), American politician
- Tom Taylor (mayor), retired mayor of Newmarket, Ontario
- Tom Taylor (rugby union) (born 1989), New Zealand rugby union footballer
- Tom Taylor (soccer, born 1880) (1880–1945), 1904 Olympic football (soccer) competitor from Canada
- Tom Taylor (writer) (born 1978), Australian comic book author and screenwriter
- Tom Taylor (Yorkshire cricketer) (1878–1960), English cricketer
- Tex Taylor (baseball) (Tom Taylor, born 1933), baseball player-manager
- Tsquared (Tom Taylor, born 1987), American professional video game player
- Tom Taylor, character in the 2004 film The Altruist

== See also ==
- Thomas Taylor (disambiguation)
- Tommy Taylor (disambiguation)
- Tom Tailor
