= John Olver (disambiguation) =

John Olver (1936–2023) was a United States representative from Massachusetts's 1st congressional district.

John Olver is also the name of:

- John Olver (ice hockey) (born 1958), Canadian ice hockey coach
- John Olver (rugby union) (born 1961), English former rugby union player

== See also ==
- John Oliver (disambiguation)
