= Jack Oliver =

Jack Oliver may refer to:

- Jack Oliver (scientist) (1923–2011), American geophysicist
- Jack Oliver (weightlifter) (born 1991), British weightlifter
- Jack Edward Oliver (1942–2007), British cartoonist
- Jack P. Oliver (1931–2020), Republican member of the Ohio House of Representatives

== See also ==
- Jackie Oliver (Keith Jack Oliver, born 1942), British former Formula One driver and team owner
- John Oliver (disambiguation)
