= George E. Loyau =

Anglo-Australian journalist and author

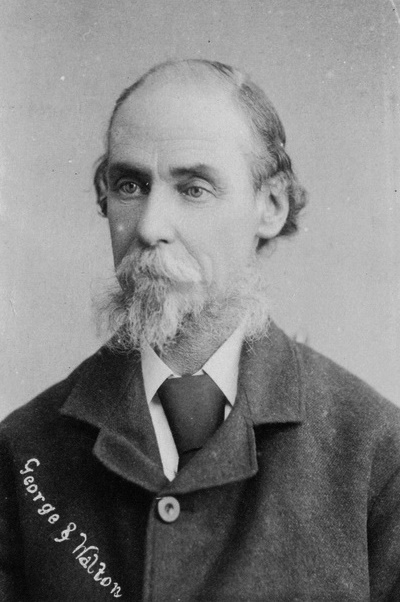
George E. Loyau

George Ettienne Loyau (15 April 1835 – 23 April 1898) was an English-born traveller, poet and historian in Australia, best known as the author and editor of Notable South Australians. He also wrote as George Chanson, 'Cosmopolite' and Roundabout.

== History ==
Loyau was born in London, a son of George Ettienne Loyau and Catharine Loyau, née Chanson, and emigrated to Australia aboard Investigator, arriving in Sydney in August 1853; according to his own accounts despatched by his mother, who was related to the Earl of Chichester. He travelled extensively throughout Australia, working at a variety of occupations, but from 1860 to 1890 chiefly worked as editor of various newspapers and magazines:

- 1861–1862 Burnett Argus at Gayndah, Queensland, followed by Maryborough Chronicle
- 1862 reporter for the Queensland Guardian or Queensland Daily Guardian

In 1865 he moved to Sydney, where he had various jobs, or was unemployed, for seven years.

- c. 1875 editor of Gundagai Times for six months
- 1876 journalist in Melbourne
- 1877 The Australian Family Herald : a weekly magazine of interesting literature (1877). (perhaps only three issues published)
- 1878–1879 The Bunyip of Gawler, South Australia
- 1880–1881 Illustrated Adelaide News
- "For a number of years proprietor of a business journal in Victoria"

In 1878 he helped found, and served as secretary for, the Gawler Literary and Dramatic Society which, despite his best efforts, failed to thrive. On leaving Gawler he lived in Adelaide for a few years. By 1895 he had moved to Maryborough, Queensland, where he wrote a history of the town. His last shift was to Bundaberg, Queensland, where he died, leaving a widow and family of one son and three daughters or two sons and four daughters with no means of support.

== Poems published in newspapers ==
Some early examples of his very extensive poetic output, described by one critic as "A dish of shingles"

- To a Little Stream (1862)
- A Shepherd's Lament (1862)
- Lines on the Centenary of Robert Burns, The Shepherd, The Slaver's Child
- The Australian Seasons

== Works by George E. Loyau ==
- New South Wales Comic Songster 1861
- The Queenslanders' New Colonial Camp Fire Song Book c. 1865
- The Sydney Songster 1869
- The Australian Seasons 1871 — four-part poem
- Australian Wild Flowers 1871 — a collection of poems
- Colonial Lyrics 1872 — book of original poems
- The South Australian Annual: Tales by Well Known Writers 1877, 1881, 1887 eds. include stories by Loyau
- George E. Loyau (1880). Handbook of Gawler. Goodfellow & Hele. Available as .pdf electronic resource ISBN 1921081074.
- The Personal Adventures of George E. Loyau 1883
- The Representative Men of South Australia 1883
- Notable South Australians 1885
- The History of Maryborough 1897

== Bibliography ==
- Hugh Anderson (1991). George Loyau: the Man Who Wrote Bush Ballads. incorporates contents (lyrics and melody) of the two songbooks mentioned above.
- Henry Stuart Russell (1888). The Genesis of Queensland: The history of Maryborough and Wide Bay and Burnett districts from the year 1850–1895 compiled from authentic sources by George E. Loyau. Digital copy available from Microfilm Services, State Library of Queensland, Brisbane.

== Family ==
Loyau married Eliza Ann "Annie" Sharp in Brisbane on 5 May 1862. He married again in Sydney on 13 December 1865, to Paulina Lynch. By 1879 he was married to Eleanor Ann Loyau, née Parker. His children included:

- daughter (24 September 1876 – ?) born in Melbourne
- Lilly Eleanor Loyau (6 July 1879 – 18 December 1879) in Gawler
- Rose Juliet Loyau (6 July 1879 – ?), her twin, in Gawler
- Augustus Edgar Loyau (16 August 1881 – ?) in Adelaide
- Eleanor Angas Loyau (21 May 1883 – 7 June 1886) in Adelaide
- Gertrude Isa Blanche Loyau (30 April 1887 – ?) in Adelaide

== An obituary ==
William John Sowden, who wrote for The Kapunda Herald as "A. Pencil", wrote:

The Herald last week recorded the death in Queensland of Mr. Geo. Loyau. Poor old man! — what a relief his death must have been to himself. Many years ago he lived in Adelaide as a sort of literary hack, both before and after he edited the Gawler Bunyip, into which he put good writing of the novelette type. Like most poets, he was of a dreamy, unpractical nature, and he was always in trouble as the sparks fly upward. At the last he fell ill, and a few of us pressmen subscribed a purse to him. The next we heard of him was that he was editing a little paper in a suburb of Melbourne. He was fond of telling of a mystery which attached to his birth. I think that he fancied that he was related to some noble if not royal family, and that cruel circumstances kept him out of his rights. On the whole, he was one of the men for whom one always feels sorry. He had not genius enough to elicit admiration, but he was a good plodder, and yet he never seemed to " get on." All his plans went awry with the most provoking persistency — he was constantly "down on his luck."

I mentioned just now something not complimentary to his business qualities, and so I ought in fairness to show that he had a notion of the right number of beans required to count five. One of the books which he published in Adelaide was a biography of leading colonists and other men who wanted cheap celebrity. What a lot of them have died since, by the way! Among the notables of the time was poor David Bews, years now gathered into the dead brigade. Loyau wished to have a notice of Bews, and asked him to supply one. This David was too diffident to do, and he said to me – "You know more good about me than anyone else does, so just oblige me by writing a bit of a pedigree for Loyau's book." I wrote nearly a page – it was a little volume – but when I took the copy to poor old Loyau his face bore an expression of doubt. "This is rather long," he remarked. " Why," said I. "here's so-and-so, who is not nearly so prominent as Bews, and yet you've given him a page and a half." "Ah," he answered, "that is the case, but Mr. Bews has only subscribed for one copy of the book, and so-and-so has ordered half-a-dozen."

After all, Loyau was not alone in practically applying the theory that a man's biography should depend on the numbers of the copies of the biographical work bought by him. Some public men encourage this sort of thing; and not unknown is the circumstance of the man with the longest purse getting the longest notice in personal publications relating to the colonies. I am acquainted with the particulars of cases in which two Australian politicians paid very handsomely for a specially complimentary notice in a book. One gave £75 and the other £50, but there was at that time a boom in the market for literary puff.

== Sources ==
- William H. Wilde; Joy Hooton; Barry Andrews (1994). The Oxford Companion to Australian Literature (Second ed.). Oxford University Press. ISBN 0-19-553381-X.
