= Archdeacon of Ardagh =

Province of Armagh
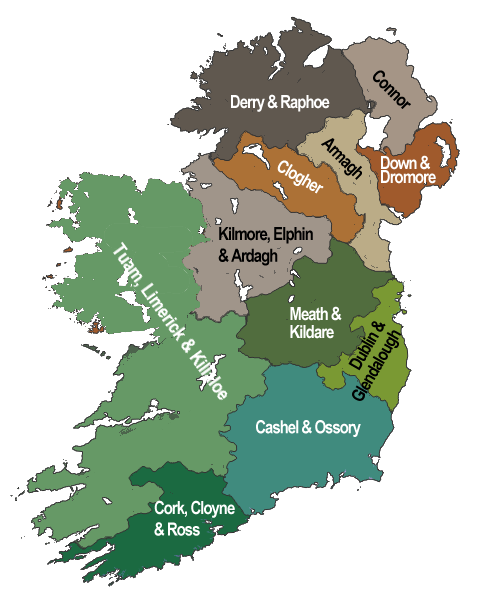
- Church: Church of Ireland

The Archdeacon of Ardagh was a senior ecclesiastical officer within the Anglican Diocese of Ardagh. As such he was responsible for the disciplinary supervision of the clergy within the Diocese.

The archdeaconry can trace its history back to Joseph Magodaig who then became the Bishop of Ardagh. The Archdeaconry is now combined with that of Elphin, one of two within the United Diocese of Kilmore, Elphin and Ardagh

== List of archdeacons ==
Previous holders include:

- 1683–1696 Andrew Charlton
- 1705–1747 Thomas Taylor
- 1751–1762 Robert Hort
- 1762–1778 John Oliver
- 1778–1790 Chambre Corker
- 1805–1820 Robert Beatty
- 1820–1839 Charles Le Poer Trench, a younger son of William Trench, 1st Earl of Clancarty,
- 1839– Marcus Gervais Beresford, DD, PCi,
- Thomas Carson, LL.D., later Bishop of Kilmore, Elphin and Ardagh, 1870 –1874
- John Richard Darley DD, later Bishop of Kilmore, Elphin and Ardagh, 1874 –1884,
- 1874–1891 Fitzmaurice Hunt
- 1891–1896 Frederic Potterton
- 1896–1915 William Moore, later Bishop of Kilmore, Elphin and Ardagh, 1915–1930.
