= Brisbane central business district =

Brisbane CBD
- Suburb
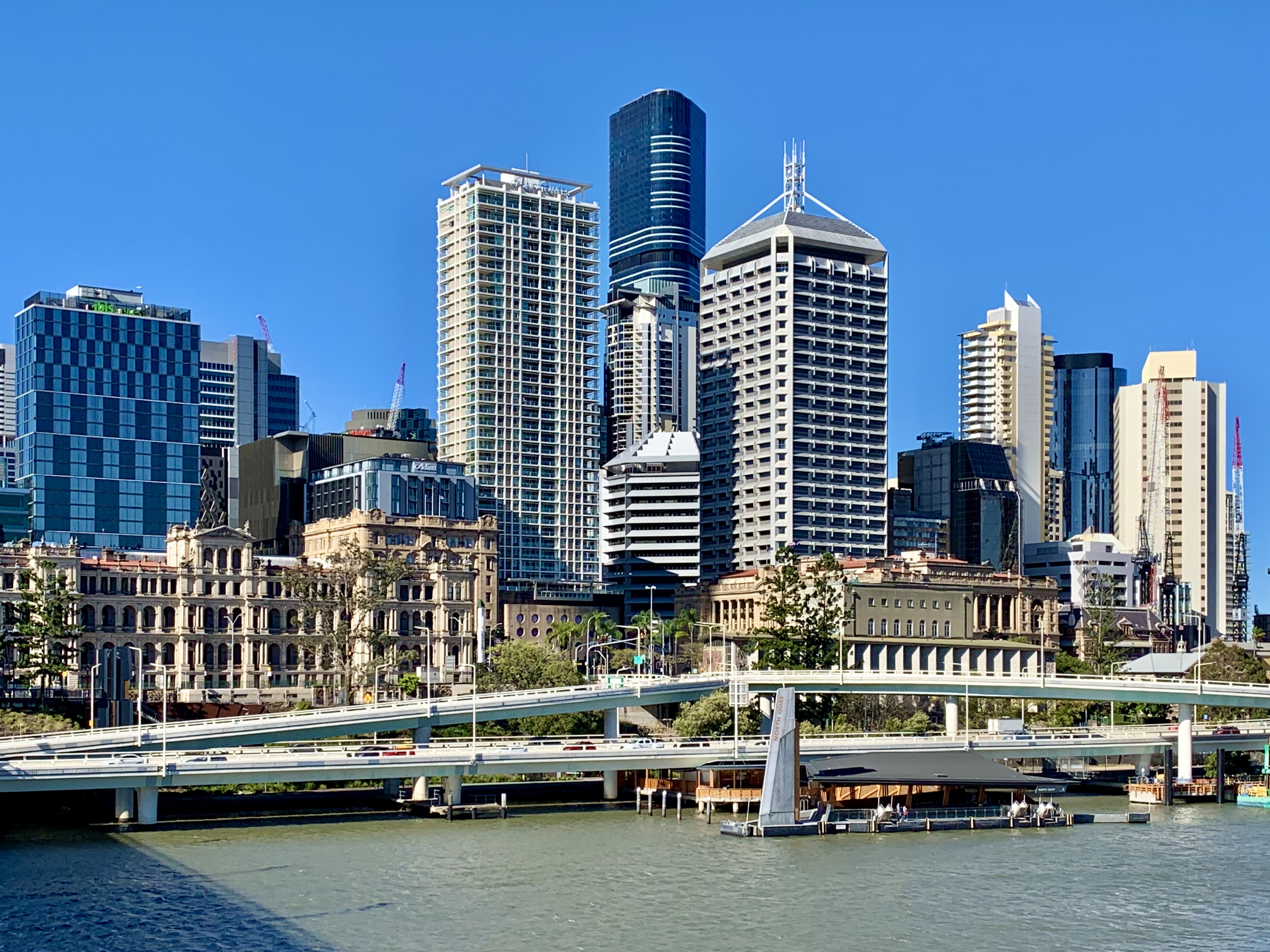
- Brisbane CBD, looking across the Brisbane River from South Brisbane, 2020

- Interactive map of Brisbane CBD
- Coordinates: 27.4677°S 153.0261°E
- Country: Australia
- State: Queensland
- City: Brisbane
- LGA: City of Brisbane (Central Ward)
- Location: 918 km (570 mi) NNE of Sydney; 1,185 km (736 mi) NNE of Canberra
- Established: 1825

Government
  - State electorate: McConnel
  - Federal division: Brisbane

Area
  - Total: 2.5 km^{2} (0.97 sq mi)

Population
  - Total: 12,587 (2021 census)
  - Density: 5,030/km^{2} (13,040/sq mi)
- Time zone: UTC+10:00 (AEST)
- Postcode: 4000
- County: Stanley
- Parish: North Brisbane
Suburbs around Brisbane CBD
Petrie Terrace	Kelvin Grove; Spring Hill	Fortitude Valley
Milton	Brisbane CBD	Kangaroo Point
South Brisbane	South Brisbane	Kangaroo Point

The Brisbane central business district (CBD), officially Brisbane City, is the central suburb and central business district of Brisbane, the state capital of Queensland, Australia. It is colloquially referred to as the "CBD", "the city", or simply "town". The CBD is located on a point on the northern bank of the Brisbane River, historically known as Meanjin, Mianjin or Meeanjin in the local Yuggera dialect. The triangular-shaped peninsula is bounded by the median of the Brisbane River to the east, south and west. The peninsula, known at its tip as Gardens Point, slopes upward to the north-west where the city is bounded by parkland and the inner city suburb of Spring Hill to the north. The CBD is bounded to the north-east by the suburb of Fortitude Valley. To the west, the CBD is bounded by Milton, Petrie Terrace, and Kelvin Grove.

In the 2021 census, the suburb of Brisbane City had a population of 12,587 people.

== Geography ==
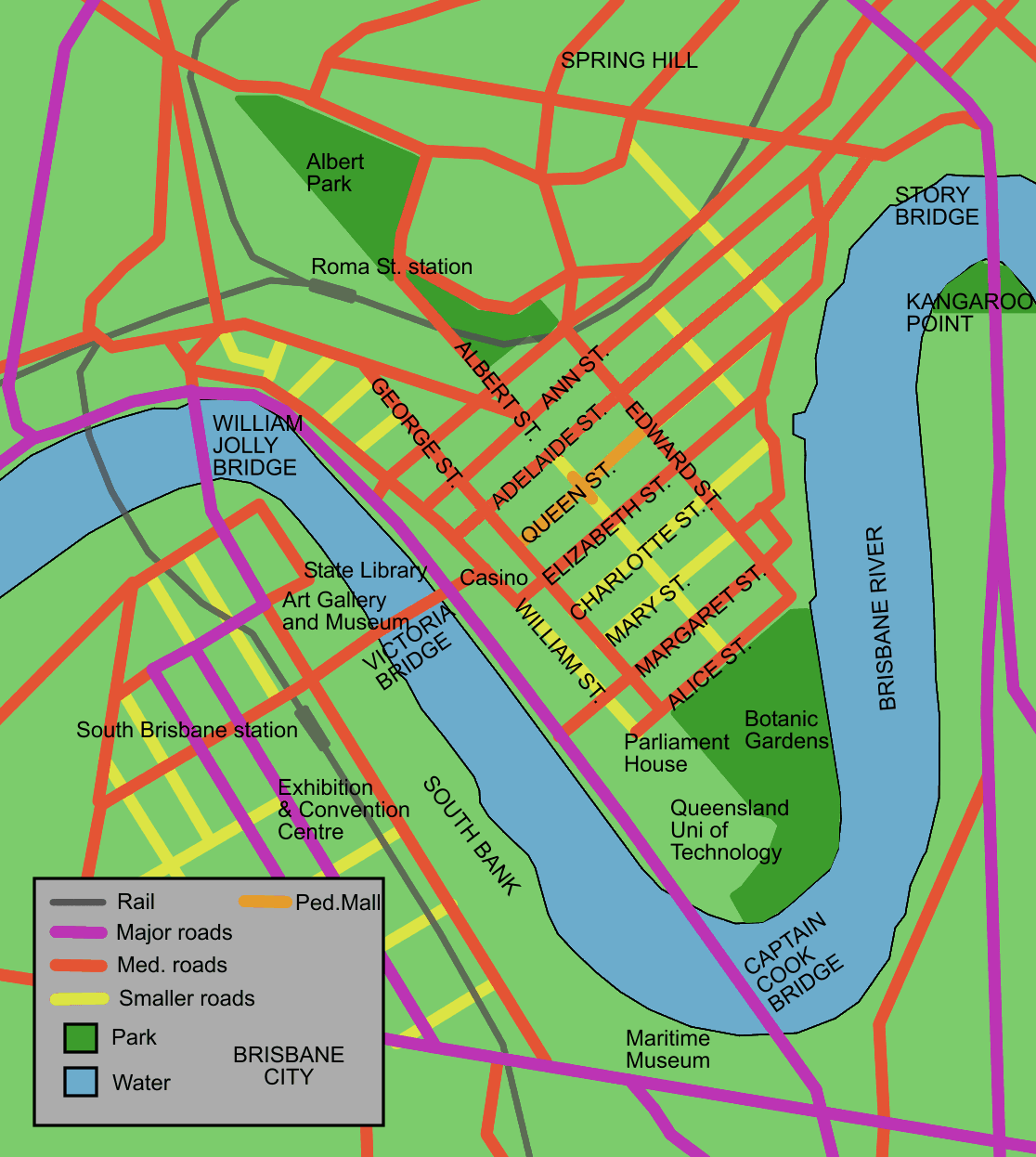
Map of the CBD

The Brisbane central business district is an area of densely concentrated skyscrapers and other buildings, interspersed by several parks such as Roma Street Parklands, City Botanic Gardens and Wickham Park. It occupies an area of 1.367 square kilometres (0.528 sq mi). The city is laid out according to a grid pattern surveyed during the city's early colonial days, a feature typical of most Australian street patterns.

Most central streets are named after members of the House of Hanover. Queen Street (named in honour of Queen Victoria) is Brisbane's traditional main street and contains its largest pedestrian mall, the Queen Street Mall. Streets named after female members (Adelaide, Alice, Ann, Charlotte, Elizabeth, Margaret, and Mary) run parallel to Queen Street and perpendicular to streets named after male members (Albert, Edward, George, and William).

The CBD's squares include King George Square, Post Office Square and ANZAC Square (home to the city's central war memorial).

The Brisbane central business district was built on a spur of the Taylor Range with the highest spot in the suburb being Wickham Terrace. North Quay is an area in the CBD that was a landing point during the first European exploration of the Brisbane River.

=== Petrie Bight ===
Petrie Bight is a reach of the Brisbane River (27.4636°S 153.0351°E), which gives its name to the small pocket of land centred on the area under the Story Bridge's northern point, around the Brisbane River to Admiralty Towers II. The location was originally known as Petrie Gardens and was an early settlement farm, one of two that provided food for the colony. The site was named after Andrew Petrie and has been the base for water police and in earlier times wharves. The location of Customs House and the preference for wharves was due to the site being directly downstream from the central business district.

== History ==
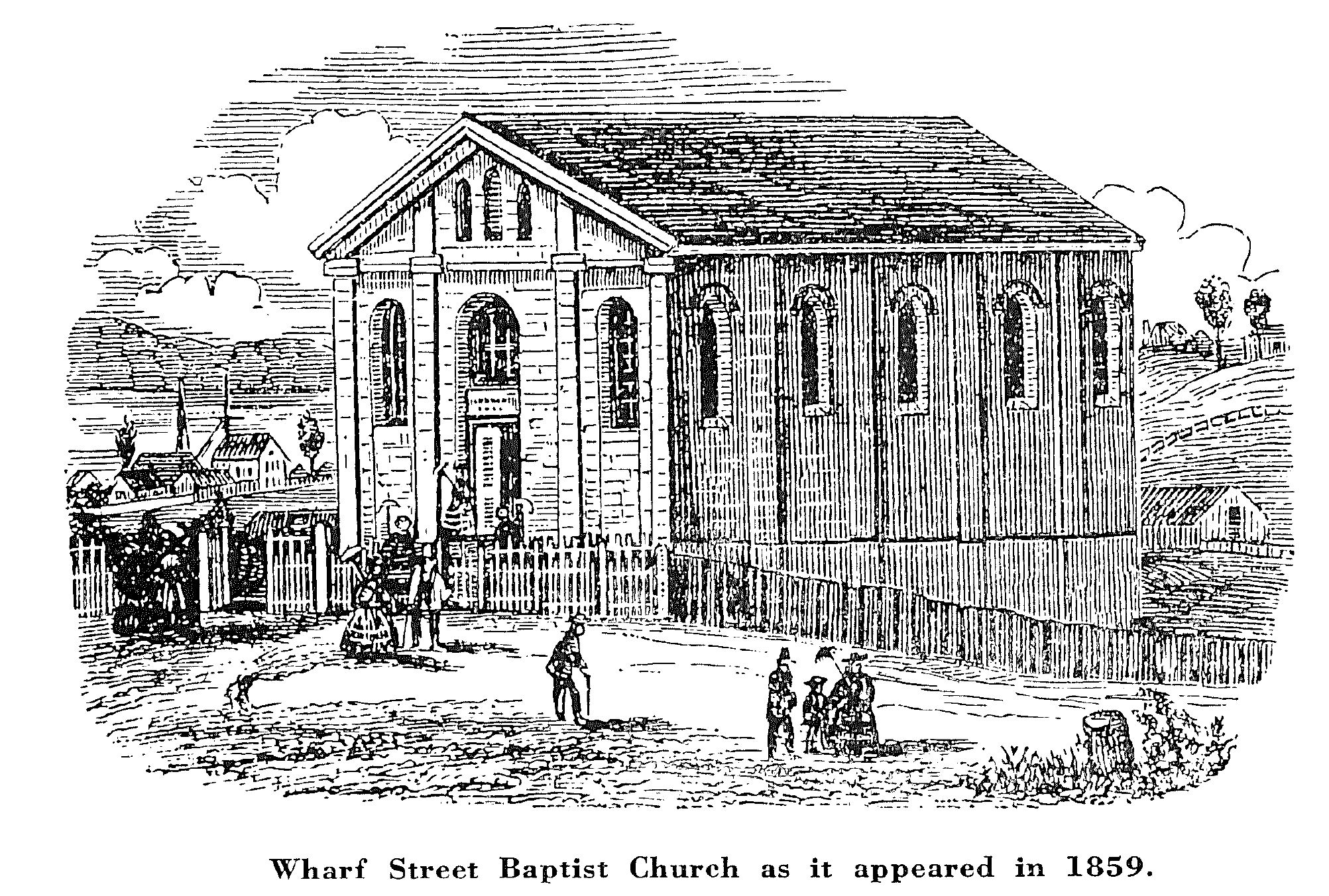
Wharf Street Baptist Church, 1859

Wharf Street Baptist Church opened at 38 Wharf Street (corner of Adelaide Street, 27.4652°S 153.0296°E) on 6 February 1859. It was the first Baptist church to be built in Queensland, the Brisbane congregation having previously met in a range of public buildings since forming in 1855. It was designed in the Early Italianate style and was built by Andrew Petrie. The church was 57 by 34 feet (17 by 10 m) and could accommodate 250 people. The cost was £2000 for the land and building, but part of the cost was covered by donations, e.g. Thomas Blacket Stephens partially donated the land. In 1881, the church was enlarged, but the need for further growth resulted in a decision to build a new church, the City Tabernacle in Wickham Terrace. The Wharf Street church was sold, holding its last service on 5 October 1890 with the tabernacle being dedicated on 9 October 1890. The building is no longer extant. On Tuesday 25 May 2021, a Baptist Historic plaque was placed at the site to commemorate the church.

On 2 April 1860, the Queensland Government opened its first school, the Brisbane National School in Adelaide Street under headmaster John Rendall with an initial enrolment of 50 boys and 8 girls.

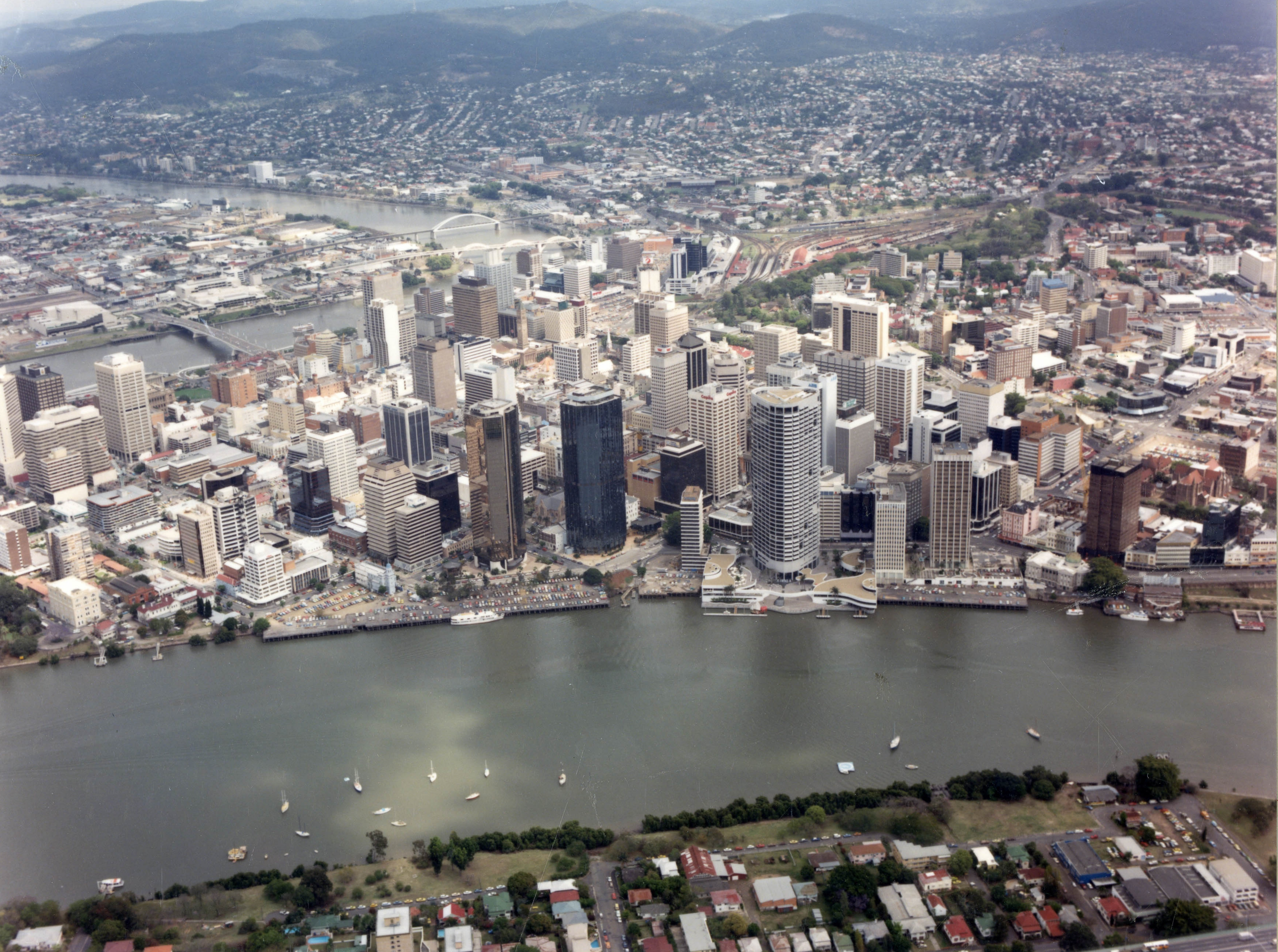
Brisbane CBD and the Brisbane River, as seen from Kangaroo Point, 1989

A congregation of the Church of Christ was established on 23 September 1883 in the Brisbane central area. In the late 1890s the congregation purchased 430 Ann Street (27.4628°S 153.0302°E) to establish their first church, still operating as at 2021 under the name Your Church.

The Brisbane City Library opened in 1965, moving into Brisbane Square in 2006.

The city centre was damaged by the 2010–2011 floods.

== Demographics ==
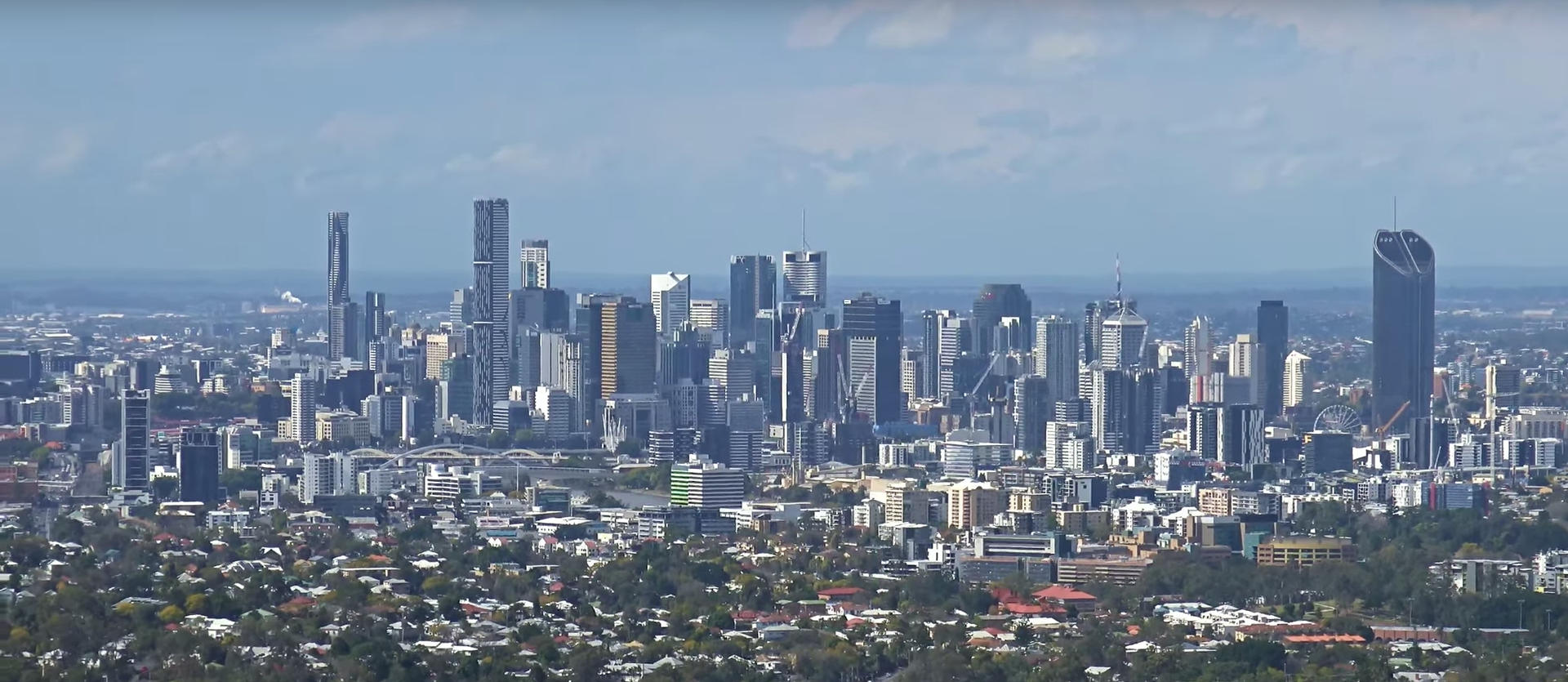
Skyline of the central business district from Mount Coot-tha 2017.

In the 2016 census, Brisbane City had a population of 9,460 people.The most common countries of birth other than Australia were China 16.0%, South Korea 8.3%, England 3.7%, Taiwan 3.2% and Brazil 2.8%. 43.7% of people only spoke English at home. Other languages spoken at home included Mandarin 12.3%, Korean 7.7%, Cantonese 3.6%, Spanish 2.9% and Portuguese 2.7%. The most common responses for religion were No Religion 43.0% and Catholic 16.8%.

In the 2021 census, Brisbane City had a population of 12,587 people.

== Education ==
There are no schools in the central business district. The nearest government primary schools are Brisbane Central State School in neighbouring Spring Hill to the north and Petrie Terrace State School in Paddington to the north-west. The nearest government secondary schools are Fortitude Valley State Secondary College in neighbouring Fortitude Valley to the north-east and Kelvin Grove State College in neighbouring Kelvin Grove to the north.

Queensland University of Technology has its major campus at Gardens Point (27.4767°S 153.0281°E), located between Parliament House, the City Botanic Gardens, and the Brisbane River. It hosts an art gallery and operates Old Government House as a museum; both of these and other facilities are open to the public.

A number of other universities have premises in the Brisbane CBD for events, networking, and short courses, but their major teaching and research facilities are not in the CBD.

== Buildings and precincts ==
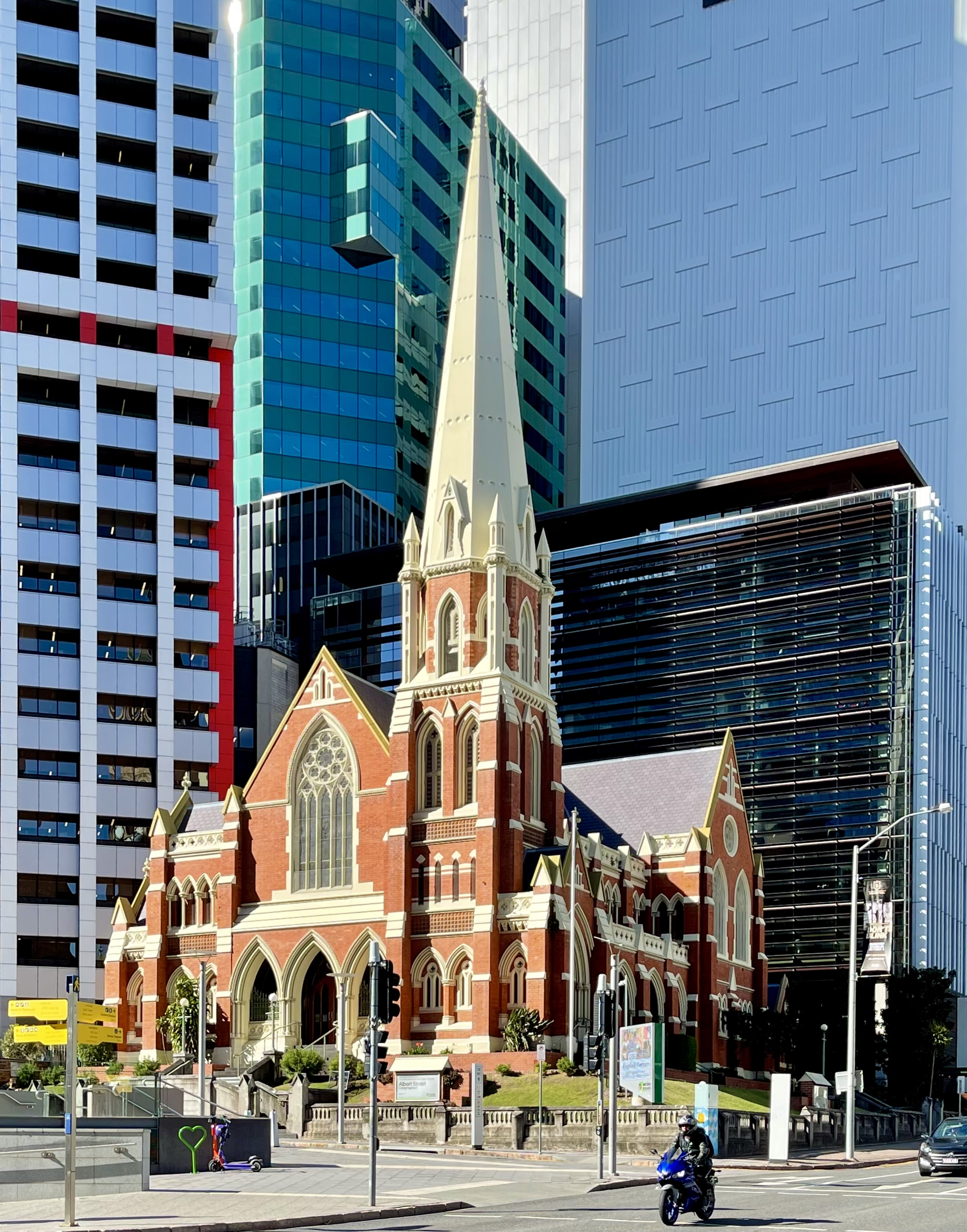
The Albert Street Uniting Church

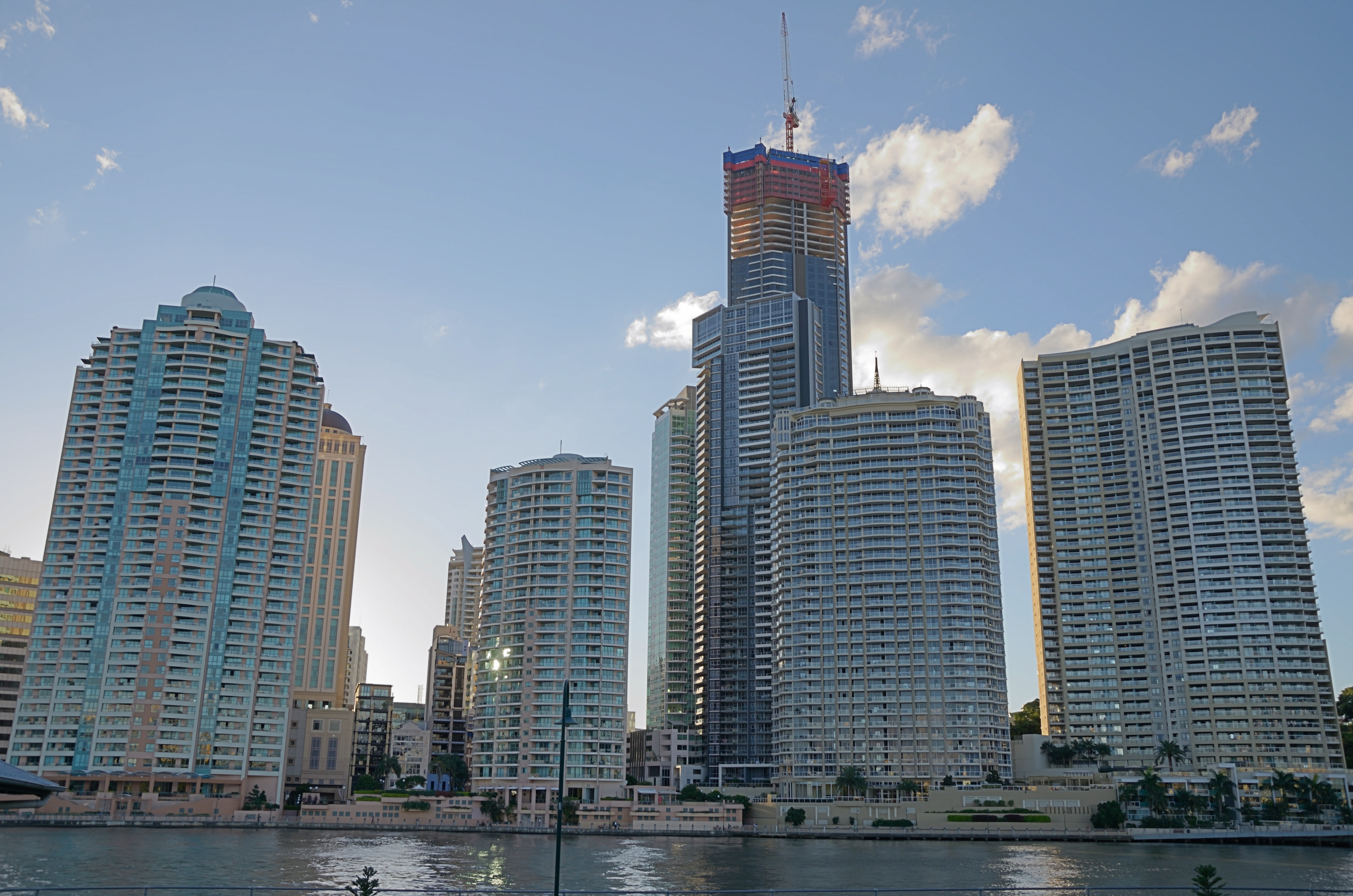
Soleil building under construction

Up until 1964, a Brisbane City Council regulation limited building heights to 132 ft (40 m). Some of the first skyscrapers built in the CBD include the SGIO building (now Suncorp Plaza) in 1970 and AMP Place in 1977. Other notable openings included Comalco Place (1984), Riverside Place (1986), the two towers of Central Plaza (1988 and 1989), and Waterfront Place (1990).

In the last few decades the number of apartment buildings that have been constructed has increased substantially. Brisbane is home to several of Australia's tallest buildings. Brisbane's tallest buildings are Brisbane Skytower at 270 metres, The One at 264 metres, One William Street at 260 metres, Soleil at 243 metres (797 ft), Aurora Tower at 207 metres (679 ft), Riparian Plaza at 200 metres (660 ft), One One One Eagle Street at 195 metres (640 ft), and Infinity at 249 metres (817 ft), which was completed in 2014.

The Brisbane CBD is one of the major business hubs in Australia. The City contains many tall office buildings occupied by organisations, businesses and all three levels of government that have emerged into a number of precincts. The areas around the Queen Street Mall and Adelaide Street is primarily a retail precinct. A legal precinct exists around the various court buildings located around the intersections of George Street and Adelaide and Ann Streets.

The government precinct was an area centred on the Executive Building that includes many Queensland Government offices. 111 George Street, Mineral House, and Education House are also located here. 1 William Street was completed in 2016, now serving the role of the former Executive Building. The Executive Building and Neville Bonner building were demolished for the state's largest infrastructure project. An urban renewal project based around the Queen's Wharf megaproject is under construction along the southern end of William Street, which includes a pedestrian bridge crossing the Riverside Expressway.

=== Rental prices ===
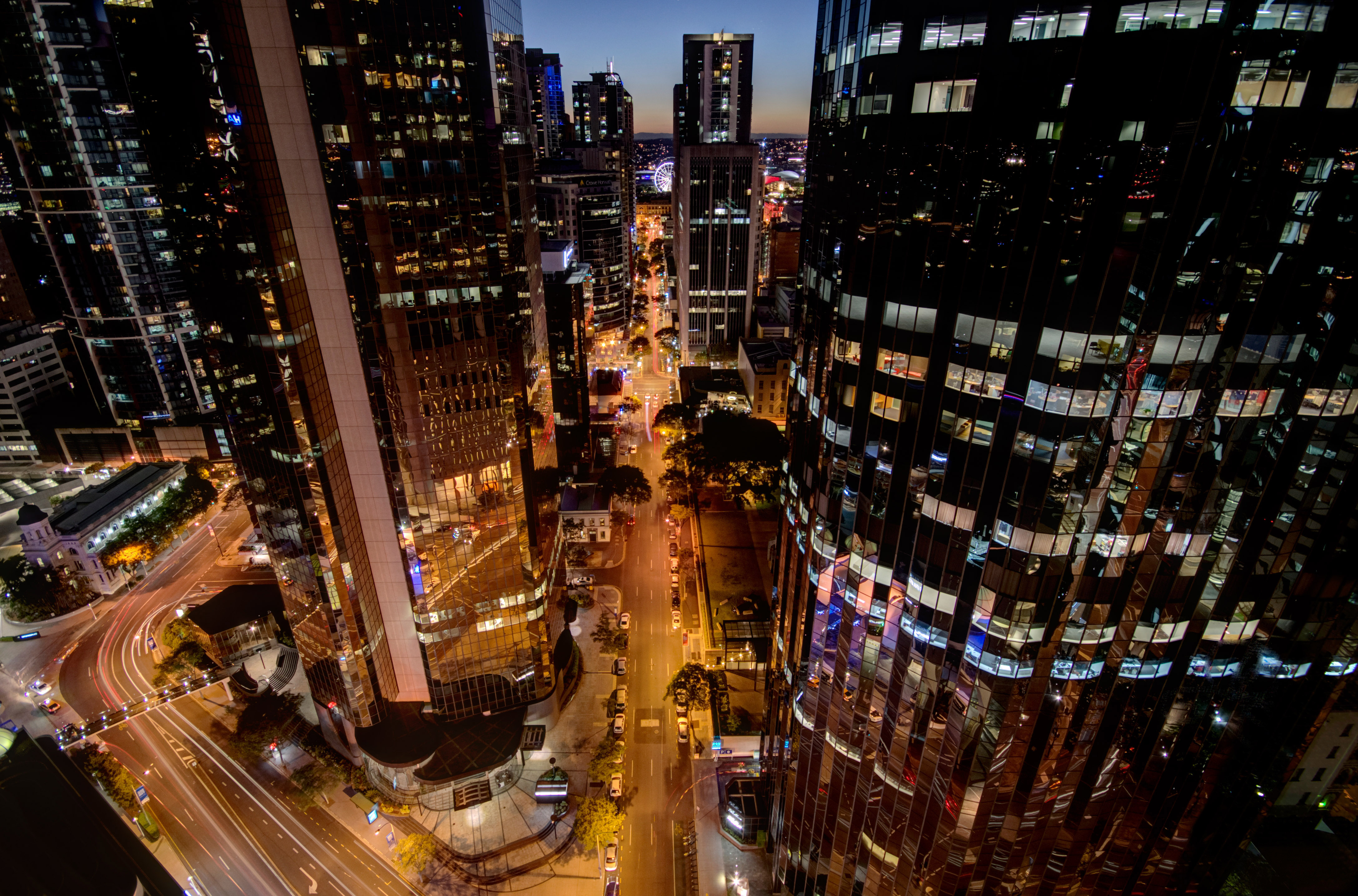
High rise view of the CBD at night.

Like most other Australian capital cities, Brisbane has experienced dramatic rises in rental prices for residential and office space before the Great Recession. At the beginning of 2008, the Brisbane central business district contained 1.7 million square metres of office space. High demand in the office market had pushed vacancy rates in the Brisbane CBD to 0.7% by January 2008, the lowest in Australia. Premium grade office space was even less vacant with an occupancy rate of 99.9%. By the end of 2009 the situation had reversed. In mid 2013 the market for office space had declined to its worst position in two decades with a vacancy rate of just under 13%.

== Attractions ==
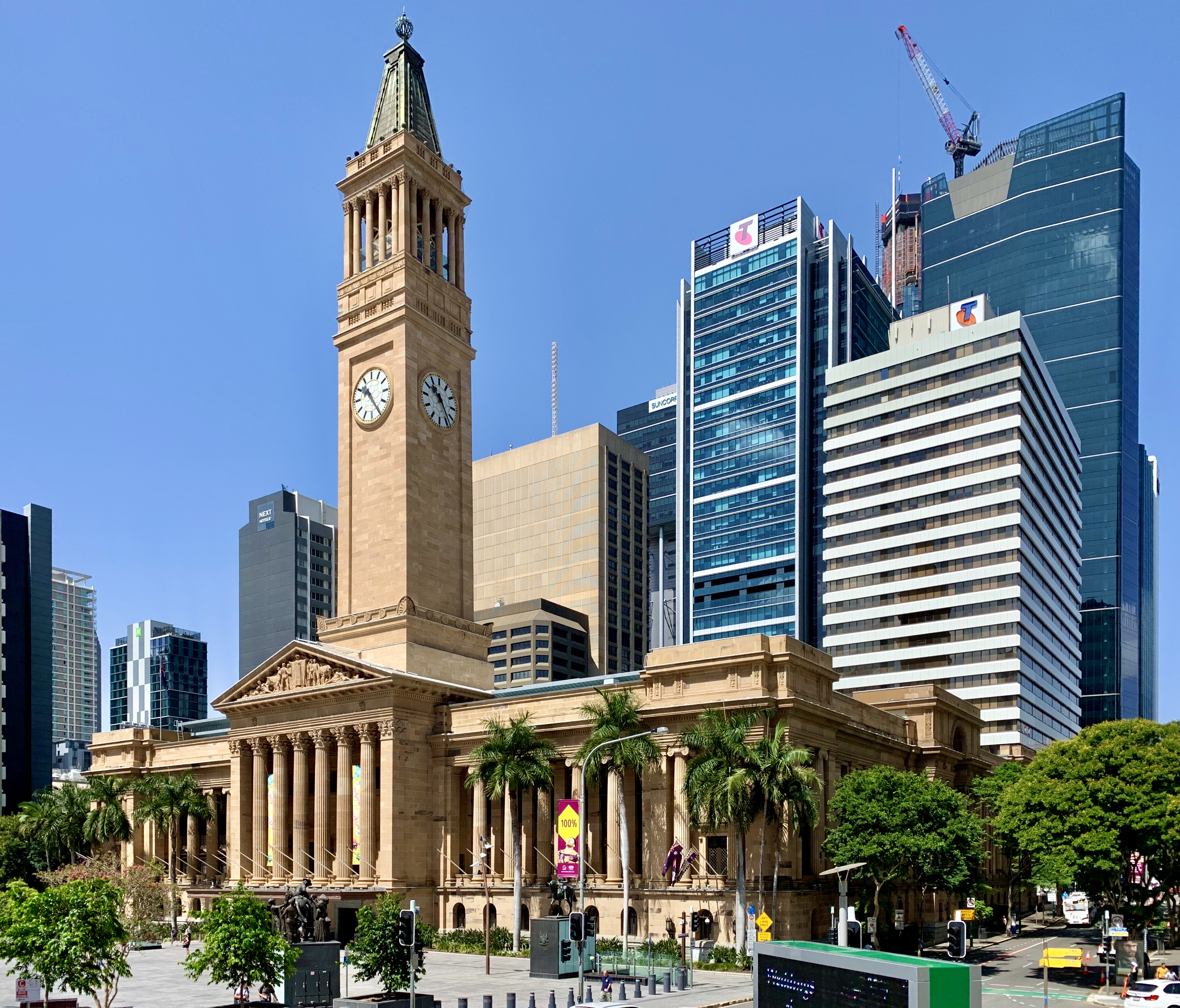
Brisbane City Hall houses the Museum of Brisbane and offices of the Brisbane City Council.

Major landmarks and attractions in the CBD include City Hall (including the Museum of Brisbane), the Story Bridge, the Howard Smith Wharves, ANZAC Square, St John's Cathedral, the Brisbane River and its Riverwalk network, the City Botanic Gardens, Roma Street Parkland, Queensland Parliament House, Old Government House and Customs House.

== Heritage listings ==
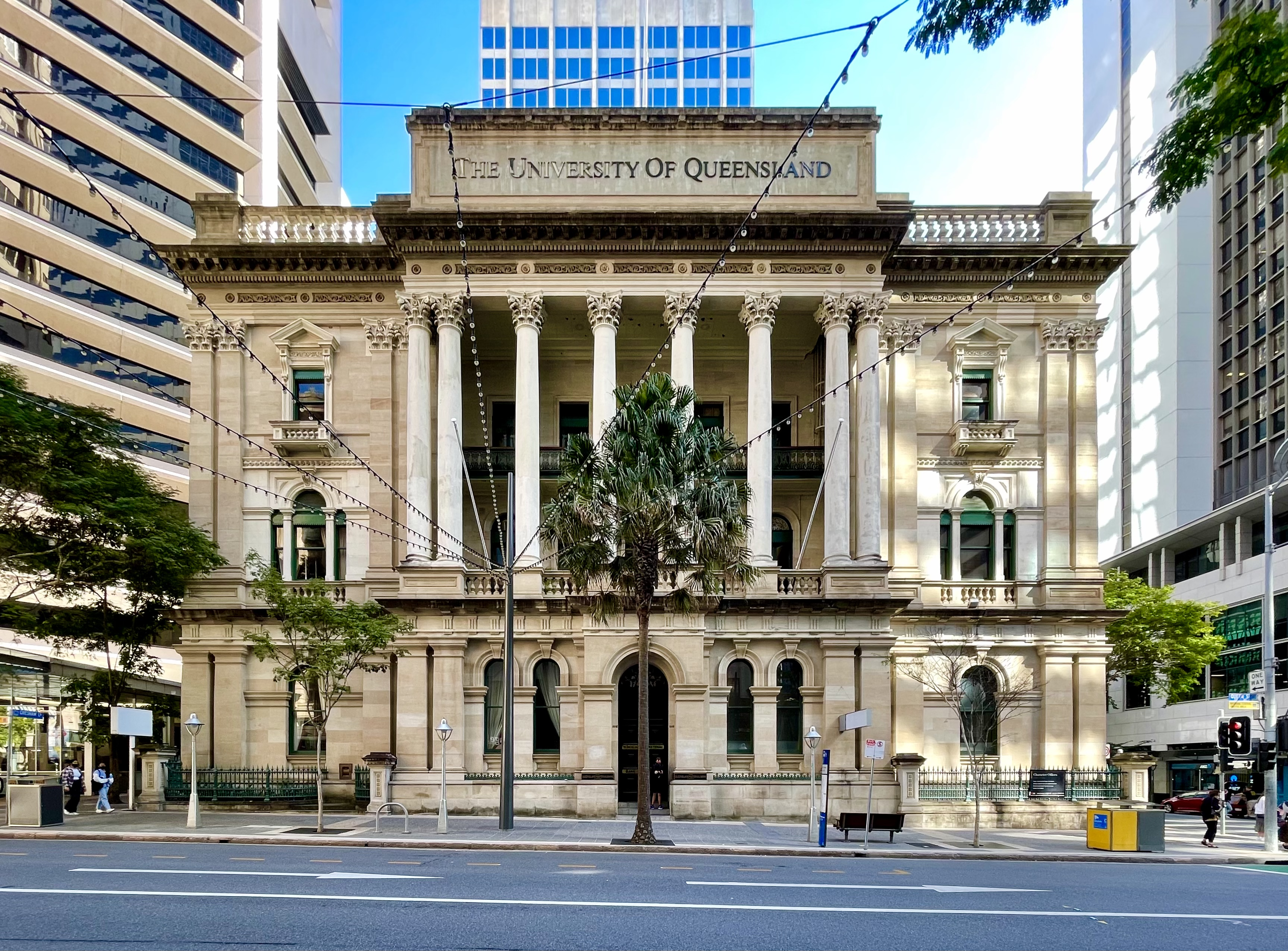
The National Australia Bank Building, located on Queen Street, was heritage listed in October 1992.

Brisbane has many heritage-listed sites, including:

- a number of properties in Adelaide Street, Brisbane
- a number of properties in Albert Street, Brisbane
- a number of properties in Alice Street, Brisbane
- a number of properties in Ann Street, Brisbane
- Boundary Street: Howard Smith Wharves
- a number of properties in Charlotte Street, Brisbane
- Coronation Drive: Coronation Drive retaining wall
- 15 Countess Street: Roma Street railway station
- a number of properties in Creek Street, Brisbane
- 118 Eagle Street: Mooney Memorial Fountain
- 118A Eagle Street: Eagle Street Fig Trees
- 123 Eagle Street (27.4673°S 153.0307°E): Riverside Centre
- a number of properties in Edward Street, Brisbane
- a number of properties in Elizabeth Street, Brisbane
- a number of properties in Margaret Street, Brisbane
- 20–30 Market Street: Wenley House
- a number of properties in Mary Street, Brisbane
- a number of properties in North Quay, Brisbane
- a number of properties in Queen Street, Brisbane
- Skew Street: First Brisbane Burial Ground
- Skew Street: William Jolly Bridge
- 168 Turbot Street: Brisbane Dental Hospital and College
- 224 Turbot Street: King Edward Park Air Raid Shelter
- 436 Upper Roma Street: Hellesvere
- a number of properties in William Street, Brisbane

== Transport ==
By road, four road bridges connect the CBD with the southern bank of the Brisbane River: the Captain Cook Bridge, the Victoria Bridge, the William Jolly Bridge and the Go Between Bridge. The Story Bridge connects Fortitude Valley with Kangaroo Point and provides access to the city from the southern bank. The Captain Cook Bridge connects the Pacific Motorway, south of the river, with the Riverside Expressway which runs along the south western edge of the city. Heading under and bypassing the CBD is the Clem Jones Tunnel. Because on-street car parking is in high demand, parking meters are installed across the inner city.

By bicycle and foot, the Goodwill Bridge allows cross river access to South Bank. The Kurilpa Bridge allows cross river access from North Quay to South Brisbane. Cyclists and pedestrians may also cross while using the Victoria, William Jolly, Go Between and Story road bridges. The Kangaroo Point Green Bridge is being built between the CBD and Kangaroo Point.

The Brisbane central business district is the central hub for all public transport services in Brisbane. Bus services are centred on the Queen Street bus station and King George Square busway station. Suburban train services pass through Central railway station, and Roma Street railway station. Roma Street also serves as the terminus for long distance and country services. The central business district is served by various city ferries. Brisbane's CityCat high speed ferry service, popular with tourists and commuters, operates services along the Brisbane River between the University of Queensland and Northshore Hamilton, stopping at several CBD wharves.

The Brisbane Riverwalk, a pedestrian and cyclist pathway adjoins the central business district along the river bank.

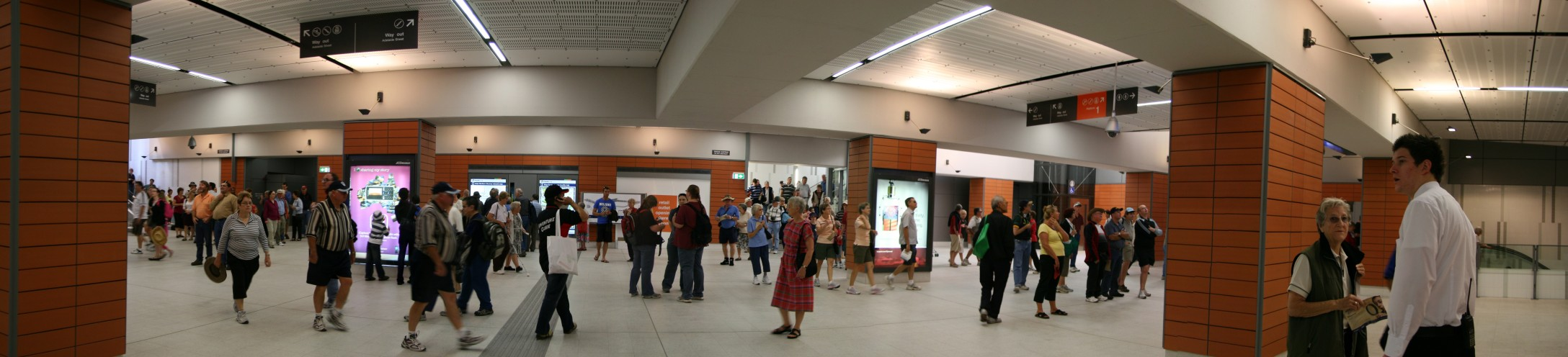
King George Square Busway Station, an underground bus station

== In popular culture ==
The Brisbane CBD has featured in a number of films, including:

- Inspector Gadget 2, the sequel to Inspector Gadget, featured many scenes showing the Brisbane CBD, South Bank and Kangaroo Point.
- The Marine, a film featuring John Cena, featured the Golden Triangle district of the CBD, during a scene in which an explosion occurred.
- Fool's Gold, a 2008 film featured the CBD primarily the Botanic Gardens throughout the beginning of the film.
- One of Jackie Chan's films, Jackie Chan's First Strike, featured the city in many scenes to the end of the film from Fortitude Valley, east of the CBD.
- The Brisbane CBD was used in Powderfinger's 2009 music video "All of the Dreamers".
- The 2009 vampire film Daybreakers was filmed in Brisbane.
- In the 2015 film San Andreas starring Dwayne Johnson, several streets of the CBD were used to portray San Francisco.
- In the 2017 film Thor: Ragnarok, Mary Street was used in a scene with Chris Hemsworth and Tom Hiddleston to portray New York City.

== See also ==
- List of Brisbane suburbs
