= Chambre Corker =

Archdeacon of Ardagh from 1778 to 1790

Chambre Corker was an Anglican priest, most notably Archdeacon of Ardagh in Ireland from 1778 until his death in 1790.

He was educated at Trinity College, Dublin. He was for many years the incumbent at Glanmire.
