= Wenley House =

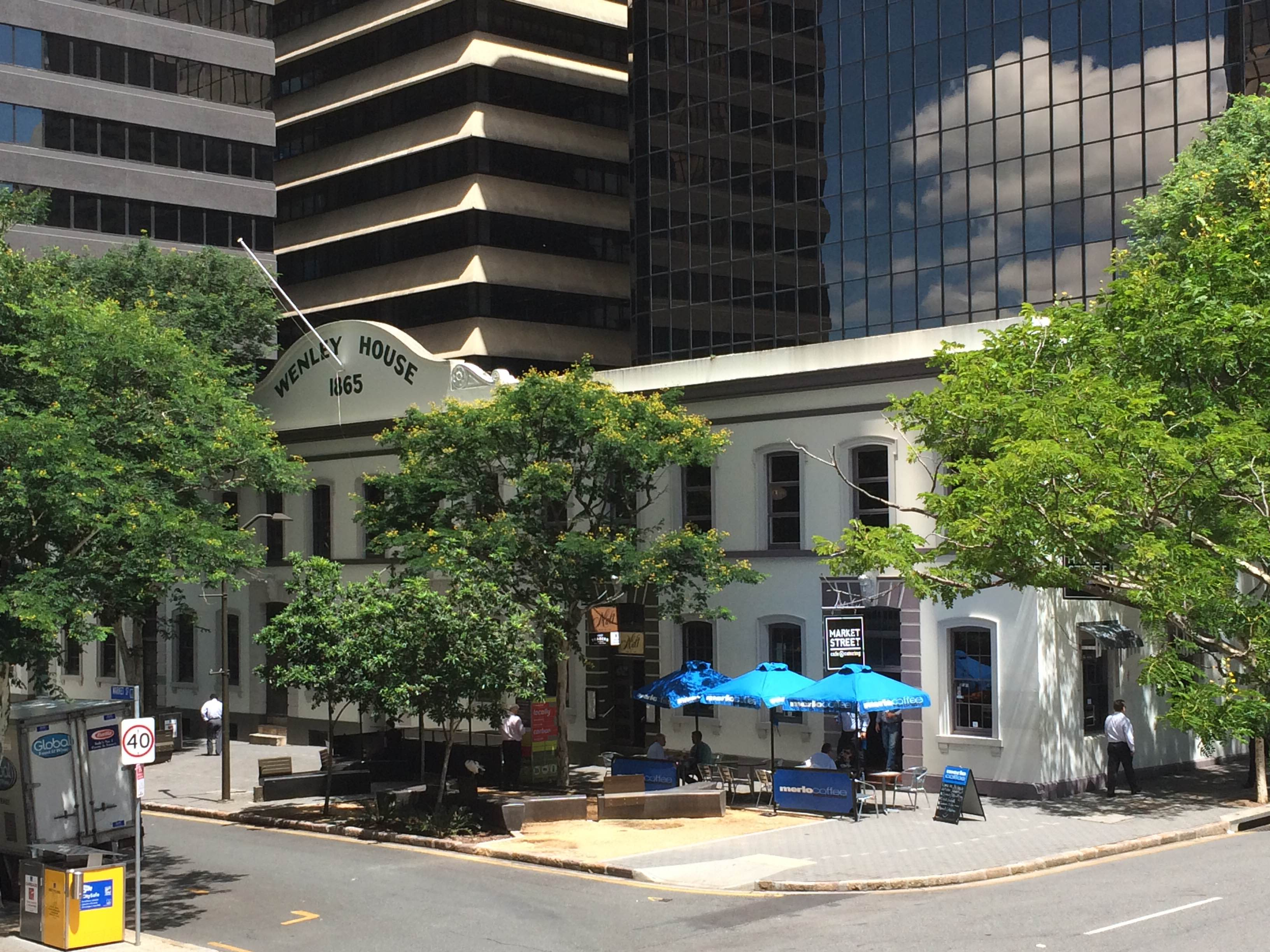
- Wenley House, 2015

- Location within Queensland Location within Australia
- 27.4695°S 153.0294°E
- Location: 20–30 Market Street, Brisbane City, City of Brisbane, Queensland, Australia

History
- Design period: 1840s–1860s (mid-19th century)
- Built: 1864
- Built for: Maurice Moses Jewell

Site notes
- Architect: Thomas Taylor
- Architectural style: Georgian

Queensland Heritage Register
- Official name: Wenley House, Jewell's Building
- Type: state heritage (built)
- Designated: 21 October 1992
- Reference no.: 600128
- Significant period: 1864 (fabric)
- Significant components: laneway, crane / gantry
- Builders: Maurice Moses Jewell

Wenley House is a heritage-listed warehouse at 20–30 Market Street, Brisbane City, City of Brisbane, Queensland, Australia. It was designed by Thomas Taylor and built in 1864. It is also known as Jewell's Building. It was added to the Queensland Heritage Register on 21 October 1992.

== History ==
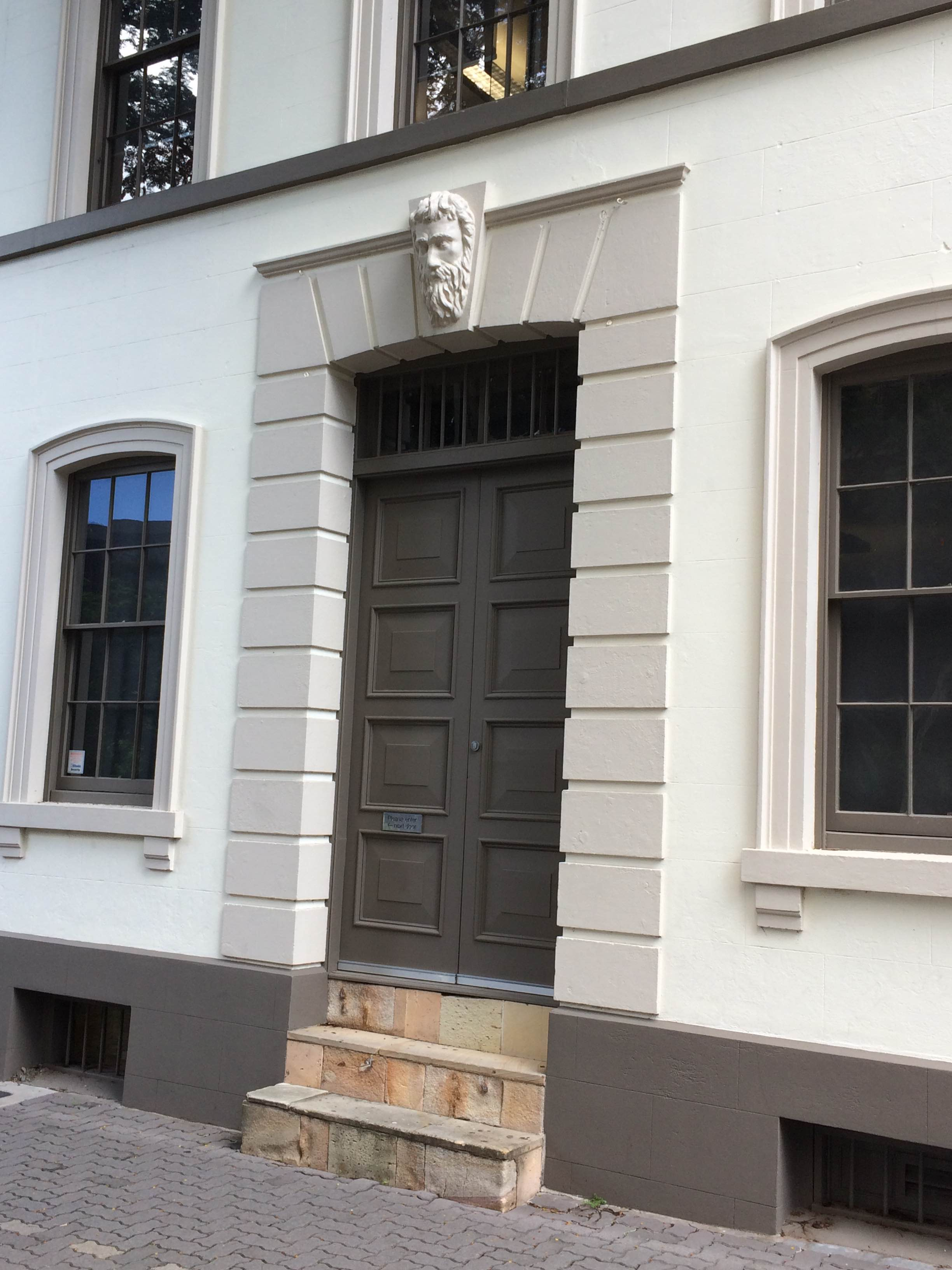
Entrances to individual tenancies, 2015

This warehouse was erected in 1864 by Maurice Moses Jewell, who came to Queensland in the early 1860s, after working as a builder in Sydney. In September 1863 he purchased this site at the corner of Charlotte and Market Streets, which was close to the wharves along the Town Reach of the Brisbane River.

Work began in January 1864 on the construction of what became known as Jewell's Building. Architect for the project was Thomas Taylor, a partner of local firm Furnival and Taylor. Taylor's design of six individual tenancies maximised potential return for Jewell. By July 1864 advertisements in the Queensland Daily Guardian advised space to let in the building, and various merchants and shipping agents took up leases.

Jewell died on 17 January 1869, leaving the property to his wife Rachel. Following her death on 6 March 1873, the title was transferred to Emanuel Barnett and Co, importers and warehousemen, which they held until 1919.

Subsequent to the decline of the shipping and warehousing activity in the area, the building has been used for a variety of purposes.

== Description ==
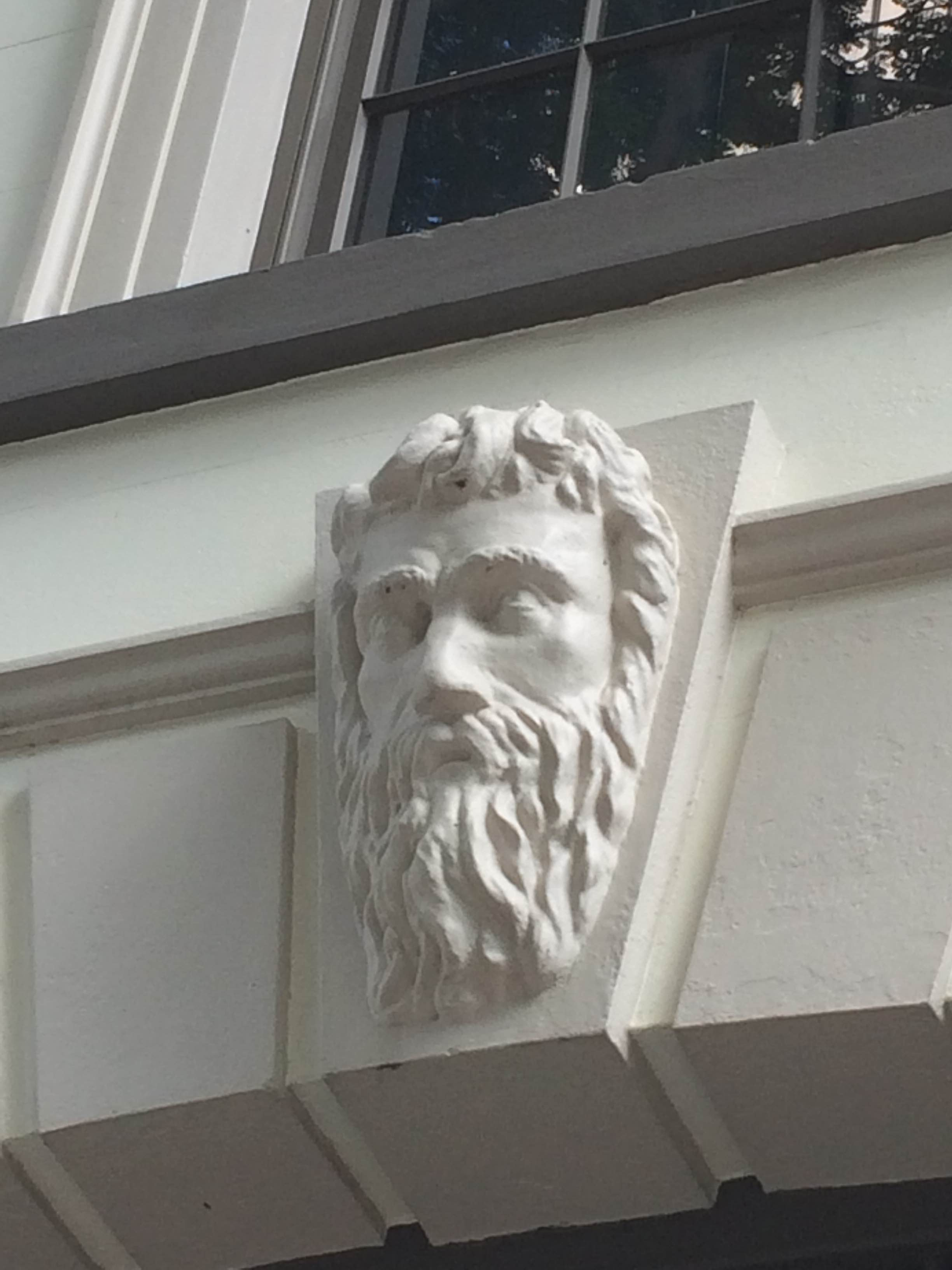
Grotesque on the keystone over the doors, 2015

This 1864 commercial building in the Georgian manner, has a strong visual impact among highrise commercial developments. It is a two-storeyed rendered brick building with basement and consists of six separate tenancies. It is symmetrically planned with each tenancy having its own entry with flanking windows, giving the facade a certain repetitive nature. The windows on the upper level are aligned with those below. A curved pediment is located over the two central tenancies at parapet level with the words "WENLEY HOUSE" following the curve of the parapet and the date 1865 centred below. The entry doorways have keyed surrounds with grotesque faces located on the keystones. There is a continuous pronounced cornice below parapet level, and a continuous band as a sill to the upper level windows. The lower level windows have individual sills supported on moulded brackets.

The rear of the building is divided into symmetrical gable ended sections that have central openings originally intended for goods delivery and serviced by small overhead gantries. These openings are flanked by double-hung windows on both levels. The end bay at the rear has been extended across the laneway. The laneway and rear of the building are also visually important.

Internally, in the tenancies at each end, roof trusses are still visible. From the basement of some of the tenancies herring-bone strutting can be seen between the joists of the floors above. Some of the floor levels have been modified to suit the different tenancies.

== Heritage listing ==
Wenley House was listed on the Queensland Heritage Register on 21 October 1992 having satisfied the following criteria.

The place is important in demonstrating the evolution or pattern of Queensland's history.

It is evidence of the former shipping and warehousing activity in the part of the city close to the Town Reach.

The place demonstrates rare, uncommon or endangered aspects of Queensland's cultural heritage.

Wenley House is a rare example of an extant 1860s warehouse in the Brisbane central business district.

The place is important in demonstrating the principal characteristics of a particular class of cultural places.

Wenley House is a fine, intact example of a commercial building designed to accommodate separate tenancies, with individual entries, roofs and loading gantries.

The place is important because of its aesthetic significance.

The building contributes to the streetscape of Market Street by virtue of its form, scale and detail.
