= Robert Hort =

Robert Hort (c.1708–1773) was an Anglican priest, most notably Archdeacon of Ardagh from 1751 until 1762.

He was the son of John Hort of Calne, Wiltshire, and in 1725 at age 16 matriculated at Brasenose College, Oxford. He graduated B.A. in 1729. He continued his education at Trinity College, Dublin. He was the incumbent at Templemichael. In 1762 he became a Canon of Windsor, and died in post in 1773.
