= Fitzmaurice Hunt =

Fitzmaurice Hunt (November 1821 – 21 April 1891) was an Anglican priest, most notably Archdeacon of Ardagh from 1874 until his death.

He was born in County Tipperary and educated at Trinity College, Dublin. Hunt was ordained deacon in 1847 and priest in 1848. He was for many years the Incumbent at Mohill.
