= Robert Beatty (archdeacon of Ardagh) =

Archdeacon of Ardagh

Robert Beatty (1774-1821) was an Anglican priest, most notably Archdeacon of Ardagh from 1805 until his death in 1821.

He was born in County Longford and educated at Trinity College, Dublin. His brother was the Ship's Surgeon on HMS Victory, and witnessed Nelson's death during the Trafalgar.
