= Joseph Magodaig =

Irish priest

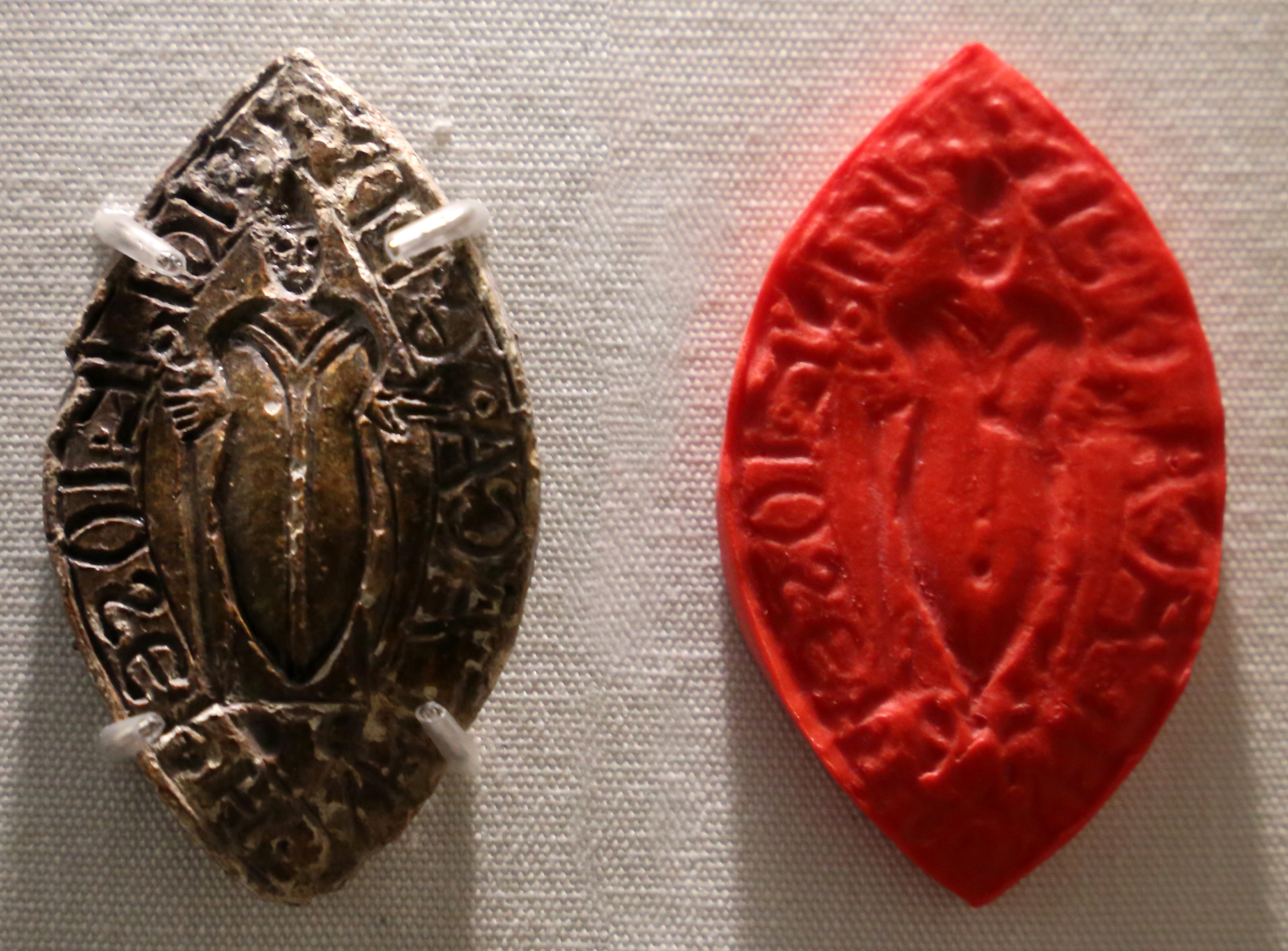
Seal of Joseph Magodaig

Joseph Magodaig (MacThegadan or Mac Teichthecháin) was an Irish priest in the mid thirteenth century: the first recorded Archdeacon of Ardagh: he was Bishop of the Diocese from 1230 to 1233.
