= John Oliver (Archdeacon of Ardagh) =

Irish Anglican priest (1720–1778)

John Oliver was an Anglican priest, most notably Archdeacon of Ardagh from 1762 until his death in 1778.

The son of Robert Oliver of Castle Oliver, he was educated at Trinity College, Dublin. He married Elizabeth, the daughter of Archbishop John Ryder. One of his sons was an admiral; and another a general.
