= Charles Le Poer Trench =

Irish Anglican cleric (died 1839)

Charles Le Poer Trench was an Anglican archdeacon in Ireland.

The son of William Trench, 1st Earl of Clancarty, he was educated at Trinity College, Dublin. He was appointed Vicar general of the Diocese of Clonfert and Kilmacduagh in 1816. He was appointed Archdeacon of Ardagh in 1821.

He died in the autumn of 1839. His brother was the final Archbishop of Tuam.
