= Thomas Baird Taylor =

American politician (1860–1937)

Thomas Baird Taylor (April 11, 1860 – November 8, 1937) was an American farmer and politician.

Taylor was born on a farm in Sterling Township, Blue Earth County, Minnesota. He went to the Minnesota public schools. Taylor lived with his wife and family in Mapleton, Minnesota. He was a farmer and raised cattle and horses. Taylor served as Mayor of Mapleton, Minnesota and on the Mapleton Village Council. He also served on the Mapleton School Board. Taylor served in the Minnesota House of Representatives from 1921 to 1924.
