= John Oliver (footballer, born 1913) =

English footballer

Personal information
- Full name: John Oliver
- Date of birth: 1913
- Place of birth: Gateshead, England
- Date of death: 10 February 1991 (aged 77–78)
- Positions: Full back; wing half; centre half

Senior career*
Years	Team	Apps	(Gls)
1933–1934	Gateshead	0	(0)
1934	Walker Celtic		
1934–1935	Stoke City	0	(0)
1935–1936	Spennymoor United		
1936–1937	Burnley	3	(0)
- * Club domestic league appearances and goals

John Oliver (1913 – 10 February 1991) was an English professional footballer who played in the Football League for Burnley.

== Career statistics ==
Appearances and goals by club, season and competition
Club	Season	League			FA Cup		Total	
Club	Season	Division	Apps	Goals	Apps	Goals	Apps	Goals
Gateshead	1933–34	Third Division North	0	0	0	0	0	0
Stoke City	1934–35	First Division	0	0	0	0	0	0
Burnley	1935–36	Second Division	1	0	0	0	1	0
Burnley	1936–37	Second Division	2	0	0	0	2	0
Career total			3	0	0	0	3	0
