= Arthur Meaby =

British youth hostel leader (1935–2003)

Arthur James Meaby (5 October 1935 – 19 September 2003) was a British engineer who was active with the Youth Hostels Association. He served on the Youth Hostels Association National Executive Committee from 1975 to 2002 and was the City Hostels Executive. He was noted for establishing many city hostels throughout England and Wales.

== Early life ==
Meaby was born in 1935 in the Chelsea area of London, England. Both of his parents died during his childhood, and his teenage years were spent living with his stepmother in Brighton. Meaby worked for Southern Railway when he was fifteen years old.

== Career ==
After completing his education, Meaby became an engineering apprentice. He trained as a railway carriage and body maker at Lancing Carriage Works in Brighton. When Lancing closed in 1965, he worked at the Southern House in Croydon, a division of Southern Railway. There, he was in charge of the wagon section. In 1988, he moved to the Southern House Derby location.

When the United Kingdom's railway system was privatized, he worked as a contractor and wrote safety and maintenance manuals for rail companies. The National Archive of Railway Oral History has an oral history of Meaby about his work in the railroad industry from the 1950s to the 1990s.

== Youth Hostels Association ==
Meaby's connection with the Youth Hostels Association (YHA) began when a Northern Irish youth hosteller was lodging with his family in Brighton. Meaby traveled with him to a youth hostel in County Antrim and soon became a member of the local Brighton YHA Local Group. Later, he was the chair of the Brighton YHA Local Group.

Meaby co-founded the cities division of the YHA in England and Wales, with future association chairman Derek Hanson. He served as the City Hostels Executive. The focus of the cities division was to establish hostels in major tourist cities such as London and Oxford, which would then help to finance the many rural hostels across the country. During the 1980s, Meaby was the chairman of the London region of the association. He oversaw the development of several hostels in London, including those in Rotherhithe, London Docklands and one near Hampstead Heath.

In 1975, he became a member of the National Executive Committee of YHA in England and Wales, serving as a member and a trustee until 2002. He was a trustee of the YHA's Gatliff Trust in 1980 and was vice chair of the group in 1990. He became a founder trustee of the Gatliff Hebridean Hostels Trust in 1988, serving as its treasurer in 1997 and 2000. Cannon was also the regional chairman of the YHA's Southern Region for six years.

When the new Eurostar terminal at St Pancras railway station was announced in 1998, Meaby established a hostel on Euston Road, opposite the station. He was also chair of the City and International Hostels Committee of the Association, overseeing hostels in central London, Oxford, Liverpool, Manchester and York. As well as his work improving urban hostels, Meaby oversaw refurbishment work at hostels in the Hebrides, namely those in Rhenigidale, Berneray and South Uist. He also oversaw the creation of the Lea Valley Youth Hostel which opened in 2002.

== Honours ==
Meaby was the honorary secretary and treasurer of the Gatliff Hebridean Hostels Trust. The library of the Lea Valley Youth Hostel was dedicated in his honour. The Lea Valley Youth Hostel at Cheshunt installed a permanent exhibition about Meaby in 2005.

== Personal life ==
Meaby never married. He was a member of St. John the Baptist Church in Colwick. He belonged to the Austrian Alpine Club, the Council for National Parks, the Cyclists' Touring Club, the Long Distance Walkers Association, the Ramblers' Association, and the Society for Sussex Downsmen.

He died on 19 September 2003 at the age of 67.
