= Andrew Charlton (priest) =

17th-century Irish religious figure

Andrew Charlton was a 17th-century Anglican priest in Ireland.

Charlton was archdeacon of Ardagh from 1683 until 1696; and chancellor of Connor from 1692 until 1696.
