= John Oliver (cricketer) =

English cricketer

Personal information
- Full name: John Archibald Ralph Oliver
- Born: 25 November 1918; Whitwell, Hertfordshire, England
- Died: 24 February 1992 (aged 73); Luton, Bedfordshire, England
- Batting: Right-handed
- Bowling: Right-arm off break Right-arm medium-fast

Domestic team information
- Years: Team
- 1936–1961: Bedfordshire
- 1951: Minor Counties

Career statistics
Competition	First-class
Matches	1
Runs scored	93
Batting average	93.00
100s/50s	0/1
Top score	84*
Catches/stumpings	0/–
- Source: Cricinfo, 4 October 2011

John Archibald Ralph Oliver (25 November 1918 – 24 February 1992) was an English cricketer. Oliver was a right-handed batsman who bowled both right-arm off break and right-arm medium-fast. He was born in Whitwell, Hertfordshire.

Oliver made his debut for Bedfordshire in the 1936 Minor Counties Championship against Buckinghamshire. He played Minor counties cricket for Bedfordshire from 1936 to 1961, making 119 appearances for the county. He made a single first-class appearance for the Minor Counties against Kent in 1951. In this match, he ended the Minor Counties first-innings unbeaten on 84. In their second-innings, he was dismissed by Ted Witherden for 9 runs, with the match ending in victory for Kent by an innings and 10 runs.

He died on 24 February 1992 at Luton, Bedfordshire.
