= Thomas Taylor (Archdeacon of Ardagh) =

Thomas Taylor was an 18th-century Anglican priest in Ireland

Taylor was educated at Trinity College, Dublin. He was Archdeacon of Ardagh from 1705 until 1747.
