= The Altruist =

- Directed by: Mick McCleery
- Written by: Mick McCleery
- Starring: Billy Franks; Bobbi Ashton; John Innocenzo; Mike Mclaughlin
- Cinematography: Mick McCleery
- Music by: Billy Franks
- Release date: November 4, 2004
- Running time: 107 minutes
- Country: United States
- Language: English

The Altruist is a 2004 thriller film, written and directed by Mick McCleery. The film stars Billy Franks as Nick Andrews, the founder of a company called Terminal Assist, which matches up thrill killers and people who want to commit suicide. The supporting cast includes Bobbi Ashton, John Innocenzo, and Mike Mclaughlin.

== Plot ==
The film opens as Terminal Assist "matches" a depressed man named Tom Taylor with a killer. Tom waits downstairs for his all-too-willing executioner. Things go awry when the killer decides to murder Tom's wife, too, and the resulting double homicide is all over the local news.

This doesn't suit the purposes of Terminal Assist, an altruistic service that strives to hook up terminally ill people with low-life hit men that enjoy killing. Founder Nick Andrews has established a working relationship with local police authorities, based on an understanding that they won't kill anyone living in the same community. The double homicide presents problems, and the police expect Nick to find a way to relieve the pressure. Complications ensue when it's soon apparent that Nick has a thing for the grieving widow Teresa, and he has competition—namely, Tom's doctor buddy Carl.

Carl has a different problem. He's falsified medical reports and hidden his diagnosis of pancreatic cancer that allowed Tom to obtain a lucrative insurance policy before his expiration date. He certainly doesn't want an investigation into Tom's death with potential criminal charges and license revocation pending.

== Cast ==
- Billy Franks as Nick Andrews
- Bobbi Ashton as Teresa Taylor
- John Innocenzo as Carl Nelson
- Mike Mclaughlin as David Easel
- Jonene Nelson as Toni
- Mike McAleer as Detective Baxter
- Norman Taylor as Ron Parker
- Nancy Jarrell as Molly Wells
- Tony Silvanio as Mr. Prentice
- Brett Heniss Jr. as Young Nick
- Georgina Manne as Nick's Mom
- Alan Pratt as Nick's Dad
- Jeff Torrico as Donny
- Kyle Ober as M-19
- Mick McCleery as Detective Shraylow
- C. Fox as Detective Murphy
- Larry Schneider Jr. as Tom Taylor

== Production ==
Filming for The Altruist took place in South Jersey on a budget of between $10,000 to $15,000. Actor Billy Franks was brought on to play the lead role alongside Bobbi Ashton; approximately 40 extras were used for the film, some of whom were people McCleery worked with at the Gloucester County Institute of Technology. McCleery came up with the idea for the script after reading an article about the statistics of murders and suicides each year in the USA. He then began wondering what could happen if a company were to exist that could pair the two groups together.

== Release ==
The Altruist premiered at The Ritz cinema in Voorhees, NJ on November 4, 2004. Four days later it had its European premiere in London at the Clapham Picture House (November 8, 2004). The Altruist later screened at the Ryde International Film Festival in 2011, where it won first place.
