= Thomas Fielden Taylor =

Thomas Fielden Taylor (1879–1937) was a notable New Zealand Anglican priest and city missioner. He was born in Chelsea, London, England in 1879.
