= Queensland Guardian =

The Queensland Guardian was a newspaper published in Brisbane, Queensland, Australia.

== History ==
The Queensland Guardian was published weekly from December 1860, two issues per week from January 1861 to March 1863, then three issues per week from March 1863. At some point, it became a daily newspaper (apart from Sundays) and was called the Queensland Daily Guardian. In July 1868 it was absorbed into the Brisbane Courier.
