= Riverside Centre, Brisbane =

Skyscraper in Brisbane, Queensland

Riverside Centre
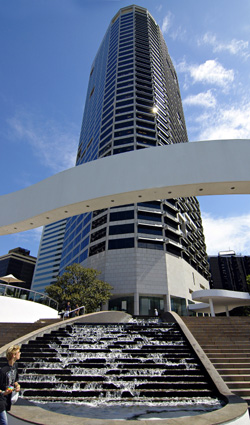
- Viewed from Brisbane River

General information
- Type: Offices
- Location: 123 Eagle Street, Brisbane, Australia
- Coordinates: 27.467174°S 153.030163°E
- Completed: 1986
- Owner: GPT

Height
- Roof: 142 m (466 ft)

Technical details
- Floor count: 40
- Floor area: 50,000 m^{2} (540,000 sq ft)

Design and construction
- Architect: Harry Seidler

Riverside Centre
- Location within Queensland
- 27.4673°S 153.0307°E
- Location: 123 Eagle Street, Brisbane, Queensland, Australia

History
- Design period: 1970s-1990s Late 20th century
- Built: 1986

Site notes
- Architect: Harry Seidler
- Architectural style: Modernism

Queensland Heritage Register
- Official name: Riverside Centre
- Type: state heritage
- Designated: 1 December 2023
- Reference no.: 602401
- Type: Commercial/Financial/Professional: Commercial offices/suites; Commercial/financial/professional: Professional offices/suites
- Theme: Working: Working in offices

Riverside Centre is a heritage-listed office building at 123 Eagle Street, Brisbane, Queensland, Australia. It was designed by Harry Seidler, and was built in 1986. Completed in 1986, it contains 40 storeys and rises 146 metres (479 ft) above ground. The building is owned by GPT. It was added to the Queensland Heritage Register on 1 December 2023.

The base of the building fronts the Brisbane River with a CityCat wharf, has many cafes and restaurants. The Riverwalk, which links the central business district to suburbs both up and down the Brisbane river was built between the water and the public space surrounding the skyscraper.

The open plaza and steps at the tower base is a recommended viewing point for the Riverfire celebrations. It formerly held the Brisbane Stock exchange. Norman Carlberg was the sculptor who collaborated with Seidler on works for the Riverside project.

The site was initially a cemetery. It was later occupied by low level buildings attached to wharves.

Riparian Plaza, the second major building in Brisbane designed by Seidler, was completed in 2005 and is located near the Riverside Centre. One One One Eagle Street is located between the two buildings.

== History ==
Completed in 1986, Riverside Centre was designed as development company Lend Lease's principal project for the 1980s. It was built during a boom in office tower construction in Brisbane, including the emerging heart of the financial district between Queen and Edward streets. Designed by internationally renowned architect Harry Seidler in 1983, the $200-plus million development included a 40-storey office tower, a plaza providing open-air public space with access to the Brisbane River, and entertainment, food and transport facilities. Riverside Centre became home of the Brisbane Stock Exchange, with a purpose-built bourse on the lower office levels. It also became a popular centre for recreation, as Brisbane's social focus was increasingly oriented towards the outdoors and the river.

=== Growth of the Brisbane Central Business District ===
Part of the traditional lands of the Turrbal and Yuggerah people, the colonial occupation of Brisbane began with the Moreton Bay Penal Settlement (1824), before the area was opened for free settlement in 1842. Established on the site of the former penal colony, Brisbane then was encircled by two reaches of the Brisbane River, and was declared a port of entry in 1846. It became the capital of the colony of Queensland in 1859, and was proclaimed a city in 1902.

The expansion of the colonial economy and related shipping activity from the 1840s shaped the need for buildings in Brisbane to house office-based work, banking, and insurance. Brisbane developed as Queensland's commercial and financial centre and its major port, hosting the headquarters for the colony's principal businesses, financial institutions, shipping companies and government. Its buildings were erected largely in economic boom periods in the central business district (CBD) in the 1860s, the 1880s, and the 1920s. These were clustered into precincts, with most of the government buildings erected along George Street, the retail and financial district stretching down Queen Street, and a shipping, wharf, and warehouse precinct along the Town Reach, the riverfront between the Botanic Gardens and the Kangaroo Point bend. Surviving wharf and warehouse buildings in this precinct include AUSN House (Naldham House) (1870s), the Port Office (1880), the Brisbane Customs House (1889), Naval Offices (1901), and Smellie & Co's warehouses (1888, 1887 and 1896).

In the early 1920s, most of the Brisbane central business district's buildings reached only one or two storeys (including residences), with warehouses up to three and four storeys, and a small number of commercial buildings extending up to eight storeys (such as Perry House, built in 1910). The 1920s boom brought taller buildings, but in 1926, building heights were restricted to a maximum of 132 feet (40 m), or eleven storeys. The maximum height could only be achieved for buildings of fireproof construction, in streets wider than 33 feet (10 m); otherwise lower limits applied. Churches, chapels, ornamental towers, domes, and decorative architectural features could exceed that limit. Accordingly, financial buildings along Queen Street were erected up to ten storeys during the 1920s and 1930s, but most of the CBD's buildings were lower, including the six-storey Finney Isles store (1936), seven-storey National Mutual Life Association Building (1926), seven-storey National Bank of Australasia (1930), and ten-storey Colonial Mutual Life Building (1931). By the time construction work was halted for the outbreak of World War II, the Brisbane City Hall clock tower was the tallest structure in the CBD, being 278 feet (85 m) high.

=== The rise of the office tower ===
The second half of the twentieth century brought considerable change to the Brisbane CBD. Brisbane's population climbed to half a million in the late 1940s, overtaking Adelaide as Australia's third largest city. The CBD's first postwar office building, an eleven-storey curtain wall modern office block for MLC, was completed in 1956, though a credit squeeze limited further construction for the next several years. Between 1950 and 1965 few office highrise buildings were constructed in Brisbane. These included: Mutual Life & Citizens (MLC) Insurance Building, the first curtain-wall high-rise building in Queensland (Bates Smart & McCutcheon, in association with Conrad Gargett, 1956), Friendly Society Building (1957), and Taxation Building (1961). These all stood below the 132 feet (40 m) height limit. Shopping centres were built in the suburbs and shipping facilities moved further downstream towards the river mouth, leaving the CBD's traditional retail and wharfing precincts in decline. The shift of the wharves occurred in port cities worldwide in the second half of the twentieth century, as small inner-city wharves could no longer accommodate larger ships nor containerisation facilities. In Brisbane, additionally, the Kangaroo Point bend was too difficult for large ships to handle. Port facilities were relocated downstream from the 1940s, and ultimately the Port of Brisbane was built near the mouth of the river. However, Queensland's mining and property industries boomed in the 1960s and 1980s, encouraging investment into the state. This, accompanied by governmental encouragement of private enterprise, favourable development policies and the removal of building height restrictions under Brisbane's first Town Plan in 1965, increased business in Brisbane's CBD. High-rise offices were constructed across the CBD to meet demand from Queensland's growing tertiary industries, particularly finance (including banking, insurance and assurance, and merchant banking); government; and to serve as state headquarters for Queensland's agricultural, pastoral and mining companies. This private development was accompanied by a city-wide council-led program to modernise Brisbane, by providing or upgrading public facilities, roads, sewerage systems, and undertaking beautification projects:

The high-rise office tower emerged as a building typology during the late 19th century in Chicago and New York in the United States of America, where architects and engineers manipulated the metal frame, electric lift, and air-conditioning systems to establish tall buildings for work spaces. During the mid-to-late 20th century this building type was increasingly constructed in Australian cities and continuously evolved with the established building tradition. While there are numerous descriptions of the height associated with the term "high-rise" worldwide, it is most often based on building codes and fire regulation applicable in individual geographical locations. With the removal of height limits in the 1965 town plan, Brisbane's high-rises rose above 132 ft (40.23m; approximately 11 storeys).

High-rise office towers from the late 20th century typically featured a structural frame of metal, reinforced concrete or pre-stressed concrete; repeated floor plates with spaces for desk work; entrance foyers for centralised access; and vertical cores that usually assisted in withstanding lateral forces such as wind and included: lifts, stairs (for fire egress), toilets and service ducts. Most buildings of this type adopted the "shell and core" concept, where the exterior design of the building was highly specified, and the interior spaces were standardised and flexible (largely open-plan), allowing for tenant-specified individual fit-outs and periodic refitting. Semi-public spaces that were at the forefront of user-experience, such as entrance foyers, lifts, boardrooms and restaurants, were often of a more refined architectural finish. During the 1960s and 1970s, heavy concrete curtain wall cladding was popular, and from the late 1970s, building designs increasingly featured flat, sleek and reflective surfaces, including all-glass facades or polished marble or granite. The curtain wall cladding was often modular and prefabricated. Sun control was handled in various and evolving ways, such as structural frame projections, external shading devices (including external hoods, screens, egg-crate sun breakers (horizontal and vertical flanges positioned in a square grid), or sun-blades), reflective glass, or interior blinds.

Between 90 and 100 high-rise offices were constructed in the Brisbane CBD between 1965 and 2000, with more in near-city suburbs. The first building to claim a height over eleven storeys, the 16-storey Pearl Assurance office, was completed in 1966. The next several years brought a series of ever-taller buildings, from the 20-storey Manufacturers Mutual Insurance Building (1967); to the 23-storey Bank of New South Wales (1970); the State Government Insurance Office (1971); the first building over 60 metres (200 ft), 167 Eagle Street (1973); and a series of high-rise towers for government, mining, investment, financial and insurance groups completed by 1976, mostly designed in the "international modern" style which dominated high-rise office design in Australia. As at 1995, 80 percent of Brisbane's office space was constructed after 1970. The most intense growth in the CBD occurred in a five year period in the mid-1980s, when development underpinned by a resources boom triggered extensive office building construction. Almost 1 million square metres (11×10^{6} sq ft) of floorspace was constructed in Brisbane during this time, significantly reshaping the city's appearance. Sydney and Melbourne had also experienced high-rise office growth, but, according to a 1985 commentator, "The boom in Sydney had to stop earlier because they simply ran out of space, and in Melbourne the boom just wasn't as strong. Brisbane was really it - the boom was extraordinarily strong and it went without any hitches".

The former wharf and warehouse precinct along Town Reach was a focus for high-rise office development. It held the city's first high-rise and two of the tallest buildings (167 Eagle Street, 1973; and AMP Gold Tower, 1978), as well as several more modest high-rise offices. The construction of the city's first fully glass-clad "Gold Tower" for AMP in 1978 gave rise to the precinct being called the "Golden Triangle", and its reputation as a desirable office location. Office towers were erected in the Golden Triangle and named for the highest-paying lessee, ranging in scale from the 18-storey, $9 million GWA House on Market Street (1982), to the record-setting $60 million AMP Blue Tower (1984), a 35-storey "technologically-advanced marvel". Other towers erected in the Golden Triangle included the City Mutual Life building (1978), Charlotte Tower (1982), GWA House (1982), Société General House (1982), Bank of Queensland Centre (1982), Bank of New Zealand (1983), and 200 Mary Street (1986). The Golden Triangle became the CBD's acknowledged financial heart as the precinct became home to a series of "gleaming office towers". This development was described as:

"Since the "82 Games high rise development has stretched up along the banks of the river, great canyons of steel, concrete and glass. Modern buildings that reflect the gold of the early morning sun."

The 1980s also saw the emergence of office towers described in real estate parlance as "blue chip", "premium" or "prime", responding to demands from the financial and professional sectors. No objective rating system of building classifications existed at the time. The Building Owners and Managers Association and Property Council of Australia's Office Quality Grade Matrix was developed in the early 1980s to aggregate vacancy statistics rather than as a building ratings tool, though it was used as such (and in 2003, Riverside Centre and Waterfront Place were ranked as Brisbane's only premium buildings). Guidelines for office building quality were not developed until 2006. In the interim, the real estate market used subjective terms of prime, premium, A-grade etc. Notable amongst these were the Gold Tower, its twin "Blue Tower" (1984), the CML building on Queen Street (1984), Capital Centre on Adelaide Street (1984), Central Plaza One and Two (1987–88), and Waterfront Place (1990). These ratings led to some tenants seeking to upgrade away from buildings perceived to be lower grade. A Jones Lang Wootton (JLW) survey in October 1985 identified Santos House, Comalco Place [Blue Tower], and the Colonial Mutual building as "prime", with the forthcoming Riverside Centre and Central Plaza One also to fit into that category. In January 1987, when JLW's associate national director said that "contrary to popular belief, there is not an abundance of prime new office space available". In a single decade (1979–1989), Brisbane climbed from one of the least expensive cities for office rentals in the world, to 15th in the world for premium office buildings, and 24th in the world for office rentals overall. Brisbane had not been surveyed in the 1979 commercial property report, but its rents were on par with the second-lowest tier of cities which had been included in the report, with only one city (Johannesburg) commanding lower commercial rents. In the same decade Sydney experienced relatively little change, dropping from the fifth most expensive city in the world for commercial rents in 1979, to seventh most expensive city in 1988, and climbing to the sixth most expensive city in 1989.

The long boom of Brisbane's office towers ended abruptly in 1990. Projects were put on hold as the Queensland economy began a downward turn, and Australia entered a recession. Several proposed major office towers projects were postponed or abandoned. Strong building activity did not recommence for another decade. After 1990, high-rise office buildings were constructed at 310 Ann Street (c. 1992), State Government offices on George Street (1993), and the Harry Gibbs Commonwealth Law Courts (1994). The Crow Howarth building, opened in 2001 at 120 Edward Street, was announced as the "first commercial office building in the Brisbane CBD for over a decade". One project, Admiralty Wharves, was ultimately constructed in the 20th century, but without office towers as originally planned.

=== Lend Lease, Harry Seidler and Associates, and Riverside ===
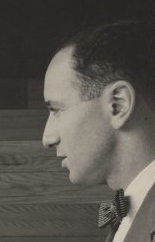
Harry Seidler, 1954

In 1979, development company Lend Lease began investigating sites for a landmark project.

Encouraged by Queensland's economic progress and forecasts for further growth, the company focused on the Brisbane CBD for its 1980s landmark. Forecasts for further growth included the state's growing population, the ongoing mining boom and resources development, and potential for growth in leisure and tourism industries, all of which would be reflected in demand for commercial office space in the central business district. The company's attention was drawn to the burgeoning financial centre, where, by 1979, office towers lined the streets between remnant shipping company and government maritime buildings. Though construction had shifted towards the river, development on riverfront sites had been limited by a proposed riverfront road. The riverside road had been recommended in the 1965 Brisbane Transport Study, undertaken by American planning firm Wilbur Smith and Associates, and adopted by the Brisbane City Council as policy. The road, or Petrie Bight Expressway, was to be a twin to the Riverside Expressway running along North Quay to the Captain Cook Bridge, and any riverfront development would have to make provision for the road. The proposed expressway was partly responsible for the inability of British developers Hammerson Group to complete its proposed three-tower riverfront plaza, restaurant and bridge development. Later it contributed to the collapse of a plan to open a Hilton Hotel on a riverfront site. The Hilton Hotel instead opened in Queen Street, in a building designed by Harry Seidler and Associates. The disused wharves of the Australasian United Steam Navigation Company (AUSN), Thomas Brown and Son, and Nixon Smith remained in situ, used for carparking.

Lend Lease Developments began to acquire multiple sites fronting Eagle Street and the river. These included the Wool Exchange, the buildings of transport company Luya Julius, Sun Alliance, Scottish Union, and Chiropractic House. In June 1981, the company announced that it had received approval in principle for a multi-million dollar riverfront development project. After a year of planning, revisions, and land purchases, in August 1982 the Courier-Mail published plans for "Riverside Brisbane", Lend Lease's $200 million development for its 1.4-hectare (3.5-acre) Eagle Street site. "Riverside Brisbane" was proposed to include an office tower, shops, residential apartments, plazas, promenades, a marina, an "historic precinct" for the soon-to-be-demolished Wool Exchange, and a section of the riverfront road, a condition of the development's approval. The accumulation of multiple large sites for a single development was not new to Lend Lease: its Brisbane project followed the successful pattern established in the 1960s with Sydney's Australia Square. In Brisbane, this involved purchases from a large number of reluctant sellers, who, according to the Lend Lease Corporation managing director, had to be made "offers they couldn't refuse". For Lend Lease, the high cost was offset by adherence to its risk avoidance philosophy. As Lend Lease Development's Queensland manager, Trevor Reddacliff, stated: "As a company, Lend Lease does not speculate and it does not create demand. A lot of leaders fail. We as a company would prefer to follow an established demand and probably pay a premium to avoid risk." The company highlighted its desire to create a "total pedestrian environment" with tourist facilities including restaurants, taverns and bistros "to give the complex life after business hours".

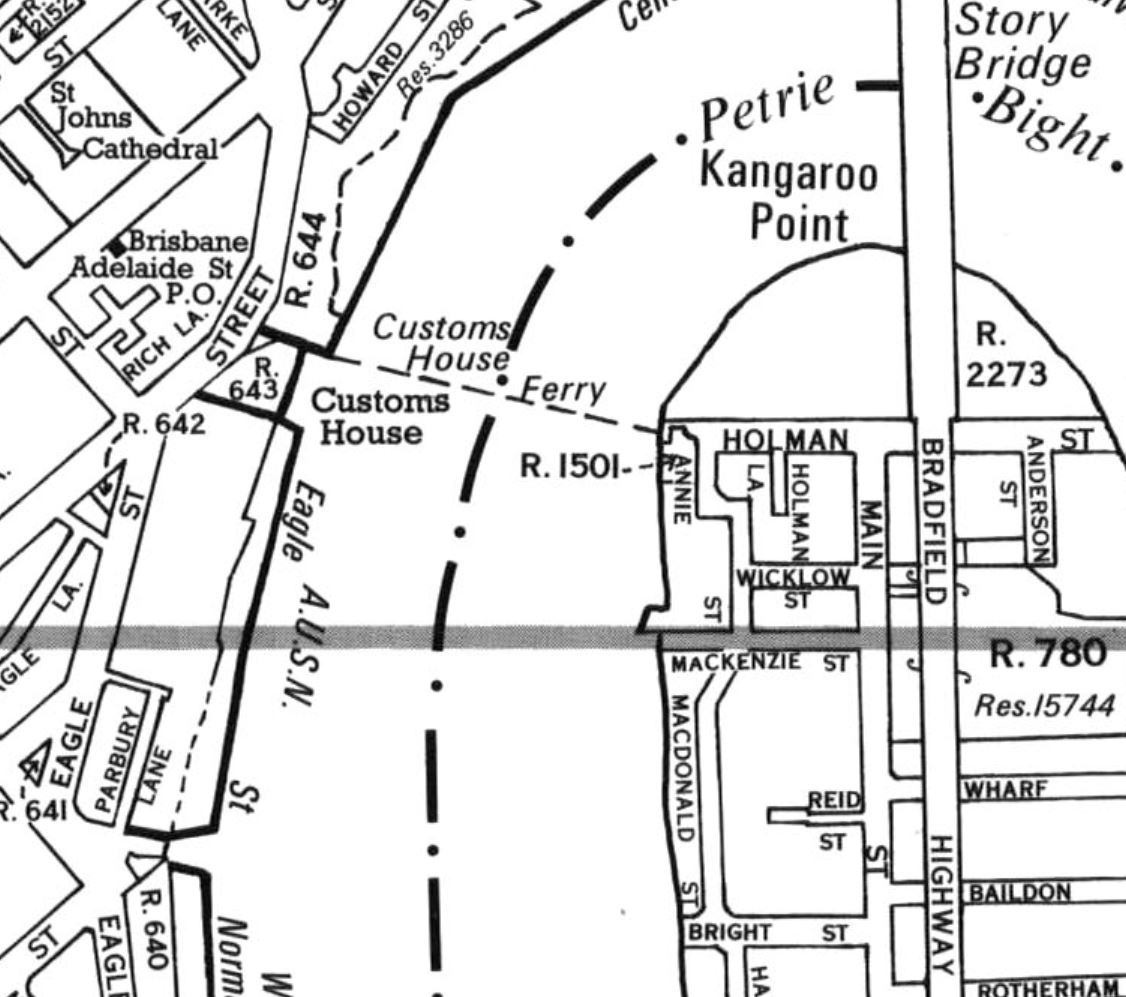
1978 map of the area showing Parbury Lane and the AUSN wharves, replaced by the Riverside Centre

Over the following year, Lend Lease continued to accumulate land, as well as leasehold over a laneway (Parbury Lane), and the AUSN's No. 11 and No. 13 wharves within the river. Having acquired control over a 2ha site, Lend Lease engaged architect Harry Seidler to redesign the Riverside project in August 1983.

Influenced by international architects, artists and designers Walter Gropius, Oscar Niemeyer, Marcel Breuer and Josef Albers, Seidler's designs strongly adhered to principles of modernist architecture. Modernist architecture developed in pre-World War I Europe and gained popularity in Australia after WWII. Notable for a rationalisation of planning, emphasising clarity and simplicity of form and detailing, the style had been adopted in Queensland in a variety of residential, religious, public, and commercial buildings. Examples include James Birrell's Centenary Pool Complex (1959), Brisbane City Council Carpark (1960), and JD Story Building at the University of Queensland (1964), Karl Langer's Main Roads Department Building (1967) and Chapel of St Peter's Lutheran College (1968), Jan Kral's Chelmer and Graceville railway station buildings (1959), and Donoghue and Fulton's Townsville General Hospital (1951). Seidler was one of the country's foremost postwar architects to design in the modernist style. "From the early 1950s onwards, the steady stream of uniformly high-quality work from Seidler's office set a standard against which the work of other modernists has tended to be judged".

As in earlier projects, Lend Lease allowed Seidler creative freedom to achieve the design requirements. Lend Lease's brief for the project was for 50,000 square metres of commercial office space with 1,500 square metre individual floor areas, including a purpose-built facility for the Brisbane Stock Exchange, a five-storey office building, retail and tavern, a hotel, riverside restaurant, public ferry, and private marina. Riverside was one of the final collaborations on which Seidler would have such freedom, after a change in Lend Lease leadership. While the facilities remained relatively consistent with the earlier design, Seidler's design for Riverside reenvisaged them into an integrated plan adopting his architectural philosophies, The Riverside project design was reportedly produced by Seidler over a weekend. At the centre of the site was a triangular-shaped office tower, set in an open-air plaza, with surrounding low-rise retail, entertainment, and commercial facilities. The buildings featured clean lines and limited ornamentation. The positioning of the office tower, set back on its plaza, was in accordance with modernist design principles, while the curved form and position of the low-rise buildings within the plaza provided an organic-shaped contrast to the geometry of the tower.

The office tower was 40 storeys, including two basements for carparking, but is sometimes described as being 38 storeys through 42 storeys. The tower's height has also been variously recorded as between 146 and 154.7 metres (479 and 508 ft). The inconsistencies appear to be due to the inclusion or exclusion of the two basement levels, the number of office levels (possibly including or excluding the open-air penthouse sky terrace), and the number of storeys occupied by the foyer. The office tower was positioned in line with the city street grid, providing views along Eagle Street and down Elizabeth Street, while its triangular shape allowed two-thirds of the office's full height glass windows to face the Brisbane River. Aluminium sunshades, fitted on two sides of the building, were designed to address the different angle of the sun on each elevation, but minimise disruption to the views. Recessed sky terraces interspersed across two sides of the building broke up any repetition. The tower was to be clad in a cool pearl-coloured granite, providing a contrast to the glass towers emerging along Brisbane's skyline.

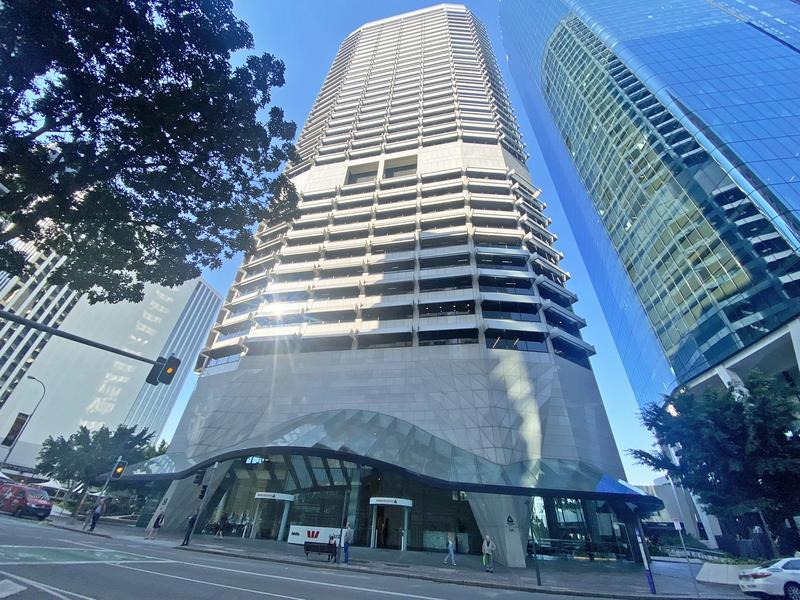
Eagle Street entrance, 2023

The main entrance to the tower building, from Eagle Street, was covered by a glass canopy with gathered columns. In 1989, Riverside Centre's entrance canopy was described as "a glass rendition of the traditional verandah" in a piece by Harry Seidler, who stated, "The fact that we occasionally have downpours can generate a response in design solutions for the covering of building entrances. The results can translate our needs into unmistakably Australian images." These were braced by radiating concentric floor ribs, providing ornament as well as being a structural necessity. This led into a four-storey (15m), glass-walled foyer, with exfoliated black granite-lined floor with strips of travertine. The foyer was ceiled by external support concrete beams brought together in a decorative web pattern, designed by Mario Desideri, successor to renowned Italian engineer Pier Luigi Nervi. Seidler continued to uphold the lessons of Nervi throughout his enduring career. Indeed, in his following buildings, such as the Grosvenor Place in Sydney and at the Riverside Centre in Brisbane and for a bridge proposal in Brisbane (1978), Seidler adopted a section for the pillar that recalls the trestle designed by Studio Nervi. Services were located in the building's core. The height of the building required three banks of lifts, with changeover levels, and a separate lift to the two basement carpark levels. The tower contained 36 levels of offices to be leased to commercial tenants. The column-free, open floor plates allowed for fit-outs to be adapted to a tenant's preferences, and easily altered when turnover occurred. At 1,500 square metres (16,000 sq ft) the tower's floor size was unusually large, allowing larger firms and businesses to consolidate their operations into a smaller area, providing advantages in improving communications and reducing costs.

Plans for the plaza changed slightly after an additional land purchase was settled in 1984. A 350-room hotel building was postponed for a later stage, while a six-storey office building morphed into a single-storey commercial structure; and a low-rise riverfront residential apartment building was removed. The latter provided additional space for the open plaza, which occupied over half of the site, providing unimpeded views and direct public access to the river. It was enhanced by landscaped gardens, trees, and a jet fountain water feature which pooled on each side of the triangular building's riverside face, and cascaded down the terraced plaza towards the river. The landscaping was by Hawaiian firm Belt Collins & Associates and the fountain by American Richard Chaix, though Philip Goad notes that Harry Seidler and Associates were responsible for the hard landscaping. Stairs and ramps (called by Seidler, stramps) carried pedestrians down to the riverfront, where a promenade extended along the site's 180m river frontage, lined with bollards linked by nautical chains, purpose-designed by the architectural team. A ferry terminal and marina, which led off the promenade, provided public and private access to the site from the river. Views from the plaza took in the sweep of the Town Reach, Kangaroo Point Cliffs and Story Bridge, framed by a curvilinear beam across the step-ramp and cascading fountain.

The public plaza was of particular significance to both Seidler and Lend Lease. Lend Lease had long envisaged the waterfront public space as an important part of the landmark project, while for Seidler, the provision of public space in the creation of an urban environment was an essential part of his design. Seidler considered it "socially irresponsible to build to high indexes of 12 or 14 unless there is a limit on site cover of no more than 25% to 35%... to generate some breathing space of the additional thousands of people that work in such buildings to create genuinely useful, new, open or sheltered urban spaces - places of repose and recreation - much needed open public space on private land". Seidler said that Riverside would be a place for people: "It'll be a meeting place, a shopping place, an eating place - a landmark for decades to come."

=== Construction of the Riverside Centre ===
Site work was underway on the project by April 1984, when the name "Riverside Centre" was publicly used. Construction work officially began in June 1984, and was launched with a flag-raising ceremony featuring the Queensland Theatre Orchestra, two tonnes of fireworks, a 400-person cocktail party, and a two-hour riverboat dinner cruise for one hundred children from the St Vincent's Home for Children. In accordance with its intention for Riverside Centre to be its landmark development of the decade, Lend Lease promoted the building project heavily, including addressing any potential issues with an immediate public relations campaign. When a series of blackouts affected CBD buildings in March 1985, Lend Lease advertised Riverside as 'Brisbane's Most Prestigious Powerhouse', promoting it as "the only major centre with 4 generators capable of supplying 100% power to the whole building, a technological masterpiece".

Civil & Civic began construction of the office tower in 1985, progressing at an average of one floor every four days. The core was built first using a jump-form technique, and the concrete tower was poured in place, with prestressing occurring on site. Economic considerations built into the design helped to speed construction and minimise costs; the corners of the tower's triangular shape were rounded to simplify the design, and repetition of elements allowed for uniformity of structural beams. Seidler devoted much attention to the systematic manner in which the work would be erected and to the precise detailing of its tectonic form. Seidler said "A triangular office configuration with one third of a circle in each corner results in a building with only one span length for every beam and only one facade unit of identical structural spacing. This allows a rapid repetitive construction cycle". Pylons were laid into the river in March 1985 for the riverfront road, which was to run under the development, but within months, the requirement for the road had been scrapped. Lend Lease had successfully negotiated a reduction in the height level of the riverside road as plans for the development were underway. The riverside road was publicly criticised, particularly as the river itself was increasingly seen as an asset The road was finally scrapped early in Lord Mayor Sallyanne Atkinson's administration. In her autobiography, Atkinson directly connects the Riverside Centre development to the decision to not proceed with the riverside road. The topping off was celebrated in October 1985 with full-page newspaper advertisements congratulating the workers, and a large party was held. The following twelve months was spent finishing the building, plaza and low-rise buildings, installing office fit-outs, landscaping, and trees on the terrace gardens. This included a 20 metres (66 ft) Moreton Bay fig tree sailed up the river from Jacobs Well on a barge. The fig tree was chosen "to maintain the character of the area", in recognition of the stand of fig trees in a triangle in Eagle Street, but was removed some years later.

The cost of the project allowed for high-quality materials, finishes, sculptures, and artwork. A sculpture by artist Norman Carlberg, "Winter Wind", a 10m repetition of a single quadrant shape in white-painted steel was commissioned and installed in the main section of the foyer (from the Eagle Street entrance), and tapestry artwork by Alexander Calder (a favourite artist of Seidler, whose work had been used in earlier Lend Lease developments) along the travertine walls of the lift core on the north and southern sides of the foyer. The architectural team from Harry Seidler and Associates, including Harry Seidler, Henry Feiner, and Greg Holman, designed minutely detailed interior fittings in what was referred to as "a "ridiculous amount" of design creativity", including purpose-designed light-up elevator buttons, ashtrays, and skirting ducts.

Around $15 million was reportedly to be spent on interior fit-outs for tenants in the four month period leading up the building's opening, "the same efforts needed to build a small city high-rise". The Inns of Court tower, built on the corner of Turbot Street and North Quay in 1986, cost $10.5 million, while a 13-storey office tower at 316–318 Adelaide Street, opened in 1986, cost $8 million. The initial fit-out included a purpose-designed facility on the fifth and sixth floors for the Brisbane Stock Exchange, the building's anchor tenant, featuring a trading floor, theatre and a mezzanine over the foyer, and no external windows. Pre-commitment tenants were able to specify their own fit-outs from the outset, including stairs between levels. By its opening Riverside Centre had over 75% pre-committed tenants (a high figure for the time).

The plaza was also minutely detailed, with granite seating, signs, waste bins; porfido (porphyry) plaza paving; and the Riverside Centre name and logo across the site. Press releases in mid-1986 noted that the attention to detail went as far as boardroom considerations of the sandwiches to be served in the food court. The plaza buildings included a single storey commercial building on the northern side close to Eagle Street ('North Court' or north-west plaza), and Michael's Riverside Restaurant on the riverside, cantilevered over the river (north-east plaza). On the southern side, a single-storey retail court near Eagle Street flowed into a two-storey building fronting the river promenade (south plaza). The lower floor held "On the Deck" eateries and shops, while on the upper floor was 'Friday's', with outdoor bar terraces featuring finishes in imported granite and overlooking the plaza and river. The plaza buildings' financial, retail, care services and eateries would not only serve Riverside Centre workers, but also the 14,000 to 20,000 office workers employed throughout the Golden Triangle, where these services were limited. A restaurant in the Société Générale building was proposed for opening in 1982, and a cafe; was part of the AMP Gold Tower development. Some other buildings had cafeteria on upper levels, for building users, but few public eateries were located in the Golden Triangle. Lend Lease aimed to provide a range of eateries, from restaurants for business lunches to quick dine-in or casual takeaway, to Friday's, catering for after work crowds. Retail fit-outs were by Aspid International.

Climatic considerations had been woven through the design, and were implemented during the construction. The use of sunshades (installed in 1986 as the building's 'eyelids') and granite facing, instead of a glass-faced facade, reduced heat load on the building. The use of granite also reduced maintenance costs. Hailstorms in January 1985 led to extensive testing to ensure the sunshades would withstand future storms, and a year-long study was undertaken to determine individual angles of installation. The glass canopy over the main entrance and a wavy canopy connecting the tower's north-eastern entrance to the northern plaza buildings provided shelter from subtropical downpours. The length of the project allowed time to study and eliminate wind tunnels in the plaza, and to best position outdoor eating areas for summer shade and winter sun. This, Lend Lease Development hoped, "would ensure that people would be drawn to the plaza not only because of its facilities and views, but because it offered the right atmosphere at the right time of year".

Tenants moved into Riverside in September, before celebrations to mark the building's opening began on 1 October 1986. The fireworks displays, hot-air balloon launches and parachutist drops were covered in newspapers and on the evening television news. Ten days of celebrations followed. The final day's celebrations included puppet shows, helicopter rides, and another fireworks display. The tower was intended as an "intelligent building", with advanced technology installed. The office tower's "intelligence" was centred on a local area network, controlling services and building automation, communicating automatically with carpark and services, lights, and voice-activated air conditioning. The technology was advanced for the time, but was intended to allow for future technology to be integrated into the building, keeping it "state-of-the-art" for as long as possible. On completion, the building was transferred to GPT. The official handover ceremony included using the tower's advanced technology to turn on the top floor air-conditioning from Sydney. GPT had publicised its interest in purchasing the development in January 1984. This was to be GPT's first investment in Queensland, and Lend Lease chairman GJ Dusseldorp faced questions from GPT unitholders over why they should invest in a property in Brisbane. The state's population growth and the city's favourable development policies were credited with giving Brisbane the "best potential for growth of all the capital cities". GPT's February 1985 meeting, described as "Australia's largest business meeting", was held in Brisbane, where Dusseldorp was inspecting the progress of Riverside Centre. The acquisition of Riverside Centre on 30 September 1986 for an initial $171.5 million pushed GPT's assets close to $1 billion.

=== Architectural recognition ===
Riverside Centre drew immediate acclaim from the architectural world. It was covered in Australian and international architectural publications, including the Japanese Architecture and Urbanism, Sydney's Corporate and Office Design and Constructional Review, London's Architectural Review, and the Austrian Architectur Actuell. It was awarded the Royal Australian Institute of Architects' (Queensland Chapter) best building award in 1987 (joint winner with the State Works Centre, which is no longer extant), which acknowledged the "superbly detailed, sophisticated" tower as "the central focus of a well ordered urban precinct which provides the city with a fine example of the potential to be gained from positively relating development to the river". The entrance lobby was described as "somewhat overwhelming, but impressive" and overall "the incorporation of water in the pedestrian concourse, art works in the lobby and well selected furniture contribute to an overall feeling of good taste". The foyer was divisive; the 1988 Robin Dods award jury president expressed reservations over its height, but in 1992 the RAIA Queensland Chapter president called the foyer "outstanding" in its uniform use of materials and skilful integration of the structural elements into the decoration. The curvilinear beam was questioned by architectural commentators and members of the public (as it "seems to interfere with the river relationship and restricts views to Kangaroo Point", but, Seidler explained, it served a most important aesthetic purpose. It defines and forms the visual boundary to the public plaza (without which the space would just 'fall out' towards the river). This is an essential factor in creating a valid urban space in which people feel 'contained' and are tempted to linger, which they do not in open plazas without visual boundaries."

The national architectural body, the Royal Australian Institute of Architects, awarded Riverside Centre the Sir Zelman Cowen Award for non-residential works in 1987 (joint recipient with Dinner Plain Alpine Village, near Mount Hotham). The Sir Zelman Cowen Award was generally awarded for public architecture, but Riverside Centre's public pedestrian plaza set it apart from other private developments. As the jury noted, Riverside Centre reflected Seidler's approach to high-rise projects, where "the use of a high-rise solution justified by the provision of open space for people at the foot of his buildings, providing a community attraction for all those who do not directly use his building, but seek shelter in the city oasis he creates". While the project was not "anything radically new" for Seidler and his "already well-honed skills", the project's scope and size "allows his very simple clean cut design approach to make an impact by its repetition over a large area and a number of small buildings at the concourse level". Also "'Brisbane's Riverside Centre might seem, because of its substantial office tower, to have wandered over the borderline between the public and the commercial categories. Nevertheless, anyone who has been in Brisbane on a weekend, when the Riverside ground level plazas are throbbing with market stalls, eating and meeting places will appreciate what a vital contribution this architecture makes to public urban life". In addition to the "interesting architectural solutions" of the building itself (including its triangular shape, clean building lines, the texture provided by the aluminium sunscreens, and the 'imagination and attention to engineering detail' expressed in the foyer's ceiling), the "impressed jury" noted Riverside Centre's "unique relationship to the Brisbane River", linking the tower to the river and making the river "not only part of the building, but a focal point".

Renowned British historian of modernist and contemporary architecture, Kenneth Frampton, authored a publication on Riverside Centre in 1988. "In many respects Riverside Centre represents a consummate synthesis of everything that Seidler has projected and realised over the past twenty years", Frampton wrote, marvelling at the "straight-forward logic with which Seidler has arrived at the parti for Riverside Centre".

"A balance is established between the twin dialogical themes that inform the entire work; on the one hand, the opposition between tectonic and organic morphologies, on the other, the play between symmetry and asymmetry, which permeates the entire site and which will be so much more dynamic as a dialogue, once the project is complete".

In a later publication, Frampton highlighted the vertical juxtaposition of the tower against its horizontal length; the play between symmetry and asymmetry of the structures across the site, and "the contrast between the tectonic logic of the skeleton structure and its plastic amplification as an isostatic form".

Months after the completion of Riverside Centre, Seidler was named a Companion of the Order of Australia (AC) for the advancement of architecture. He and the architectural firm went on to design a number of office towers around Australia, including Grosvenor Place, Sydney (1988); Shell House, Melbourne (1989); Capita Centre, Sydney (1989); and QV1, Perth (1991). Frampton and some later commentators, including Australian architect, academic and author, Jennifer Taylor, considered Riverside Centre a standout amongst Seidler's later office tower developments: an evolution in Seidler's work incorporating the landscape concepts of South American architects Burle Marx and Niemeyer and notions of "isostasis". Neville Quarry notes that 'in his recent works, such as QV1 in Perth and the Riverside Centre in Brisbane, that Seidler's balancing of the contending pressures of rectilinear and curvilinear motifs would most closely fit Frampton's notions of isostasis". Seidler's solution to the problems of urban space in Australian architecture; a demonstration that it was "still possible to continue with a viable culture of modern architecture"; and "a notable urban achievement, which, besides being an accomplished work of architecture, regenerated an entire urban precinct and turned the focus of a city towards its river with unprecedented generous riverside plazas". In 1996, the Royal Institute of British Architects awarded Seidler the Royal Gold Medal for Architecture, one of the highest honours for architects in the world, for his body of work. In his accompanying speech, Seidler referenced Riverside Centre (alongside other projects). Seidler was the second of only two Australians to date to receive the Royal Gold Medal for the promotion of architecture, awarded since 1848 (the first being Sir Arthur George Stephenson, CMG, AMTPI, in 1954).

==== Architecture awards ====
In 1988, Riverside Centre received further recognition as the joint winner of the Robin Dods award (a triennial award by the RAIA Queensland Chapter for excellence over a three-year period), as, according to the judging panel, it 'sets an incredibly high standard as well as giving Brisbane a magnificent riverfront public space'. The building received first prize in the 1989 Marble Architectural Awards in Carrara, Italy. In 2011, the Queensland Chapter of the Australian Institute of Architects (formerly Royal Australian Institute of Architects) awarded Riverside Centre the Robin Gibson Award for Enduring Architecture. This award is given to a structure at least 25 years old, of outstanding merit that, considered in a contemporary context, remains important as a high quality work of architecture. Riverside Centre was also recognised as significant 20th century architecture by the AIA at both State and National levels.

=== Office impact ===
Riverside Centre's opening had an immediate impact on Brisbane's commercial office market. Thanks to the availability of river views across two-thirds of the tower, Riverside commanded some of the highest rents in Queensland ($444 per square metre in 1988) and was credited with increasing rental levels in prime office market from 15% to 20%. The office tower's triangular shape was selected to enable the highest number of office windows with views of the Brisbane River, as real estate professions advised that rental returns for offices with clear, unobstructed water views would be 15% higher. The presence of the Brisbane Stock Exchange in the tower encouraged legal, accounting and stockbroking firms, including some establishing Queensland offices for the first time. The prestige of the building was also acknowledged as a draw for some tenants. The Queensland Division of the Building Owners and Managers Association awarded Riverside Centre a special citation for its "outstanding contribution to the city by establishing Brisbane as a mature commercial centre and for its civic and environmental design". Developers undertaking other large office tower developments in the Golden Triangle acknowledged the new standard the project had set for the "top end of the market", while the Queensland Governor stated in 1988 that Riverside Centre "has brought a whole new dimension to the standard of accommodation to which professional and commercial organisations may aspire". Serge de Kantzow, who was behind the Central Plaza One development, stated in 1985 that his office development "would be designed specifically to fill the prestige market after Riverside opens". FA Pidgeon, then developing the Waterfront Place development nearby, said that Riverside Centre "set the benchmark and created an awareness of the desirability of prestige space", and that Riverside "had demonstrated that when a building stood out 'a country mile' ahead of the others, it created its own demand", adding that Waterfront Place "will set new standards". In 1989 the chairman of the Queensland-based development company Kern, Barry Paul, said that Brisbane needed to create more modern buildings to remain competitive: '"If Brisbane doesn't produce more Riversides and more Waterfronts, then the Brisbane CBD will be obsolete". Kern had recently completed the Harry Seidler-designed Grosvenor Place in Sydney and had planned a development, Landmark Tower, also designed by Harry Seidler, on Margaret Street.

Though a private development, Riverside Centre was highlighted by state and local governments as evidence of the city and Queensland's growth and development. It was promoted by successive Brisbane Lord Mayors as part of Brisbane's diamond jubilee and the Shine On Brisbane campaign; in the United States as a technologically "intelligent" building; and was featured in a Queensland Government television programme in the late 1980s. Its completion, alongside that of the Brisbane Transit Centre in Roma Street, prompted "a school of thought that Brisbane is capable of being the business capital of the south-west Pacific by the year 2000".

The scope and cost of the office tower development project was significant. The size of the site at 1.4 hectares dwarfed most of the sites on which Brisbane's other office towers were erected. Lend Lease had amassed a 2.0 hectare site in total (both freehold and leasehold), but stage one had been laid out on 1.4 hectares. Few other office high-rise towers were erected on such large sites, with only two subsequent projects (Waterfront Place, 1990, and Cathedral Square, 1989) are on par. The Riverside Centre site also dwarfed several CBD sites intended solely for public purposes or recreation, including Post Office Square, King George Square, Anzac Square, and Queens Gardens. For a brief time it was the tallest building in Brisbane (though its successor was under construction when Riverside opened). At a reported cost of $200 million, Riverside Centre was the first office tower development in the CBD to cost over $100 million, and was significantly more expensive than the record-setting AMP Blue Tower, constructed two years earlier for $60 million. The official cost of the project was not publicly released, though several different figures were reported. Initially reported as a $100 million in 1981, the estimate had climbed to $200 million by August 1982. By December 1983, it was reported as a $250 million project, more expensive than both Expo 88 ($180 million) and Conrad Jupiters Casino at the Gold Coast ($175 million), as Lend Lease revealed that it had already spent $40 million on the development. By 1984 this cost had been revised again to $300 million, but that figure was to include a second stage development. The development was sold to General Property Trust in 1986 for a sign-over price of $171.5 million and a total sales price of about $200 million. The project was mostly commonly referred to as a $200 million project, including by contractors Civil & Civic. Riverside Centre remained one of the few 20th century office tower developments in the Brisbane CBD to cost over $100 million, with only two further projects, both neighbours to Riverside Centre, before the economic recession of the 1990s: the two-tower Central Plaza complex designed by Japanese architect, Kisho Kurokawa, and Queensland architectural firm, Peddle Thorp, opening in two stages; and Waterfront Place, designed by Perth architectural firm Cameron Chisholm Nicol, and also opened in two stages (Eagle Street Pier, 1989; Waterfront Place, 1990).

=== Public impact ===
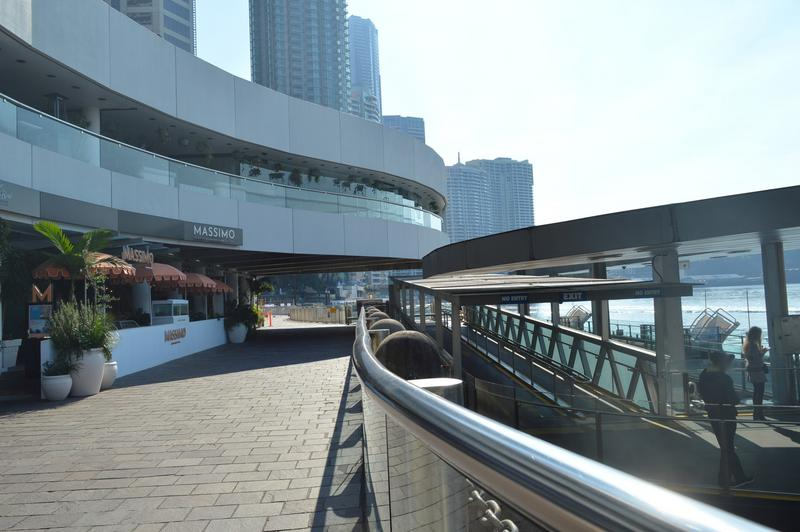
Ferry wharf at the Riverside Centre, 2023

The public aspects of the development were also quickly appreciated, as Riverside Centre began to draw people to the city after working hours. Ferry services started at the Riverside ferry wharf, which replaced the Creek Street ferry stop, in October 1986, bringing city workers and visitors to and through the site. A high-speed service running to the University of Queensland's St Lucia campus started the following year, and CityCats served the terminal from 1996. By 2003, Riverside was Brisbane's busiest ferry terminal, serving 400,000 passengers annually. The riverfront promenade was incorporated into a bikeway that was extended along the riverfront in the mid-1990s, providing riverfront access to the site for pedestrians, cyclists, and commuters. Subsequent developments, including Waterfront Place, had included promenades to link into Riverside Centre's, before it became part of Riverwalk in 1997.

The south plaza eateries were advertised to the public to "come and enjoy" while "soak[ing] up the feel of the tropics under the sun and the palms, beside the river". Friday's and Michael's became popular venues for Brisbane residents - students, those celebrating special events, and office workers - over the following years Friday's hosted Australia Day and end of financial year parties for corporate workers, charity fundraisers with up to 800 people, music events, and university student carnivals with over 2,000 people. In 2008 and again in 2018 Friday's was described as a "Brisbane institution". Building management and tenants hosted art displays, showcase exhibitions, and fundraising events in the foyer; and a viewing gallery in the Stock Exchange fit-out was open to the public. In May 1987, the recently formed "Cats Tango" craft markets were moved to the Riverside Centre plaza. Renamed the Riverside Markets, the Sunday event proved a huge attraction, bringing large numbers of suburban residents and international tourists to the site on a weekend for the next 22 years. Architectural commentators also noted the popularity of the plaza at lunchtimes and weekends with the market in 1992. The Riverside Markets were promoted internationally and won two tourism awards before they moved locations.

Riverside's development, and the intense change in the CBD's physical fabric, was accompanied by significant social and cultural change. As Brisbane's population reached over one million people in the early 1980s,. The population growth through the 1970s, particularly from interstate migration and an increasing proportion of tourists, moved Brisbane "closer to challenging Melbourne's status as second city". The city prepared to host two major international events: the 1982 Commonwealth Games and the 1988 World Exposition (colloquially Expo 88).The "Shine on Brisbane", 'Image "82" and 'Image "88" campaigns encouraged beautification in and around the city, and the city was promoted internationally (particularly in the United States) amidst a push to encourage international tourism. Brisbane was also the host of the 1989 International Conference on Tall Buildings and City Development, run by the International Council on Tall Buildings and Urban Habitat. Pedestrianism was improved in the city centre with the construction of pedestrian bridges crossing Anzac Square (1982) and the opening of Post Office Square (1984). The Queen Street Mall, opened in two stages (1982 and 1987) both improved pedestrianism and enticed shoppers to return to the city. Legislative change in the late 1970s provided for Friday night shopping in the city and Sunday trading in hotels. Riverside Centre was part of Brisbane's identity shift in the 1980s, providing facilities for al fresco dining before it was incorporated into the Town Plan in the 1990s; and popularising open, riverfront gathering space with markets and promenades in the leadup to Expo 88. Other indoor-outdoor dineries also opened before al fresco dining was incorporated into BCC town planning regulations. It was popularised at Expo 88 and Park Road in Milton had become renowned for courtyard dining before footpath dining was officially permitted in April 1992.

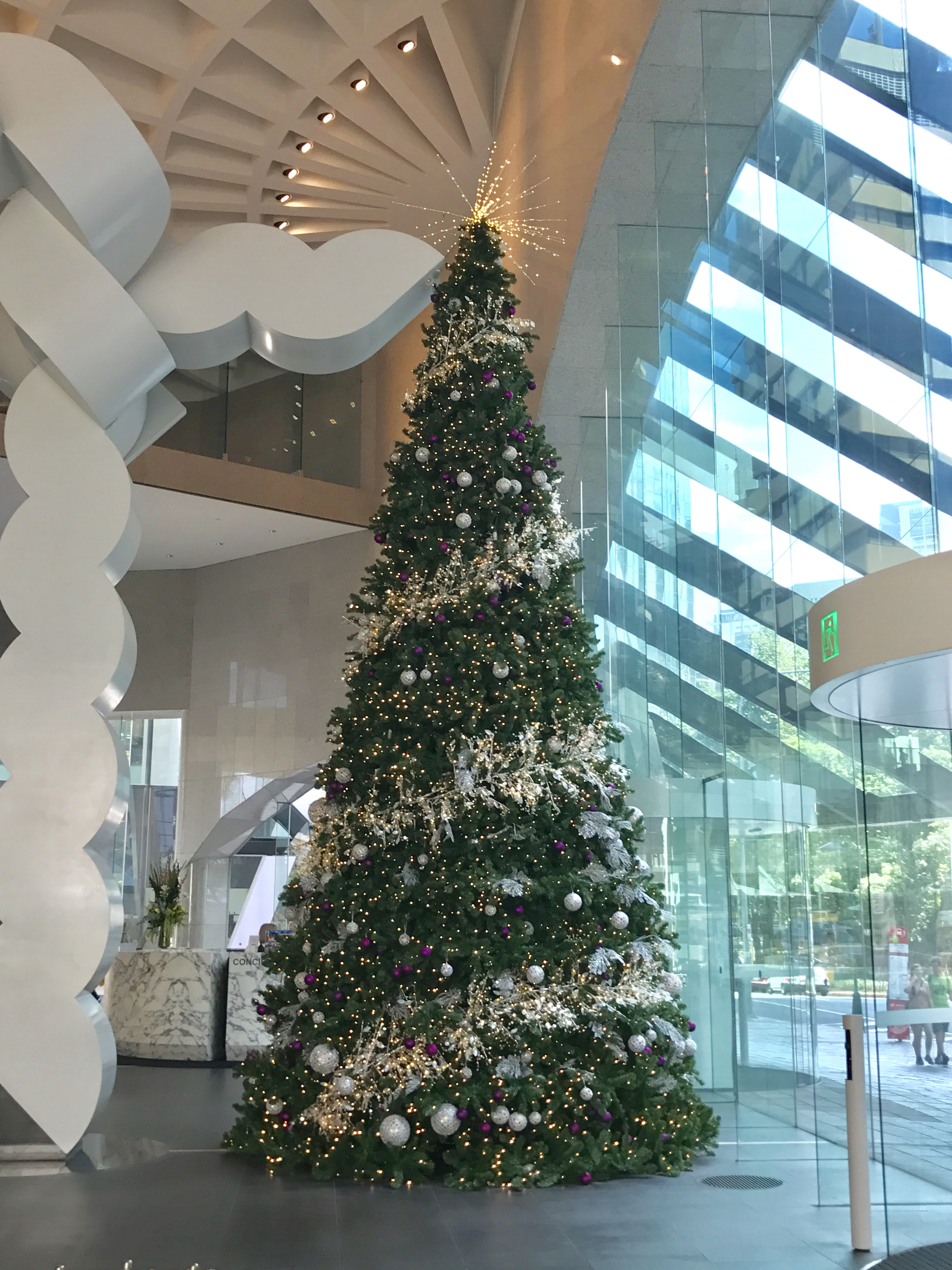
Christmas tree in Riverside Centre foyer, 2016

Riverside's opening also coincided with renewed public interest in the Brisbane River. A hub for commerce, transport and recreation from the mid-19th century, the Town Reach of the river had fallen out of favour in the second half of the 20th century, as wharves and bathing facilities were removed, and the Riverside Expressway cut off public connection to the riverbanks. Only a promenade through the Botanic Gardens provided unimpeded access to the river. From the late 1970s, river management, development and clean-up committees had emerged, urging an end to dredging, cleaning up the river, beautifying and managing development on riverbanks. Brisbane City Council declared 1987 the "year of the river", creating river management studies and strategies, and a riverfront walk was opened through the mangroves. Increasingly, images of Brisbane portrayed the river from the Story Bridge or Kangaroo Point, with Riverside Centre at their centre. The relocation of the Customs House ferry terminal to Riverside Centre placed the new office tower at the heart of river transport into and out of the city. In coming years, as Brisbane's "River City" identity emerged, Riverside Centre's restaurants and terraces became a popular gathering space for New Years' Eve fireworks, special events such as the arrival of the "tall ships" in 1987 and 2001, the docking of the Endeavour replica in 2011, the annual Riverfire festival fireworks displays, and a Christmas procession. Some commentators - such as David Malouf - credited Seidler and the Riverside Centre with turning Brisbane "in a whole new direction, so that what had been a sluggish stream at the bottom of the city's backyard became a living waterway", and ultimately the emergence of Brisbane's identity as a "River City":

=== Riverside Centre in the 21st century ===
Riverside Centre has continued to attract and retain high-profile tenants to its office tower, including stockbroking firms, banks, accountants, legal firms and in 2023, the organisers of the Brisbane 2032 Olympic and Paralympic Games. "The Riverside Centre is a funny building in that it is getting on a little big age-wise, but it does not look like it has aged," said one tenant in 2009. "It is just a very high quality building." The tower's anchor tenant, the Brisbane Stock Exchange, was replaced by the Australian Securities Exchange (ASX) in 1990, remaining a significant financial centre in Brisbane until 2005. As home of the ASX, the building was a target for protests in 2001, In 1999, a section of Riverside Centre's 2ha site was sold to Singaporean development company Bloomberg. Bloomberg and its subsidiary, Riverside Developments, engaged Harry Seidler and Associates to design a new mixed-use (residential, retail and commercial) tower for the site, to be called Riparian Plaza. Designed to complement Riverside Centre, and opened in 2005, Riparian Plaza received the AIA's National Award for Commercial Architecture in 2007. According to de Gruchy, "The sculptural entrance columns of Riverside and the new Riparian Plaza by Harry Seidler and Associates add further quality to the architectural environment of the precinct which now stretches beyond the old Customs House."

In 2007, approval was given for the construction of a new high-rise office tower at 111 Eagle Street, designed in 2009 for GPT by Cox Rayner. The development involved the removal of part of the south plaza building, containing retail on the ground floor and an opening to Friday's. A 255-square-metre (2,740 sq ft) section of the Friday's deck, 584 square metres (6,290 sq ft) of the retail court and 19 car spaces were demolished in 2008 for the 111 Eagle Street tower. Friday's retained about 1,400 square metres (15,000 sq ft) of floor area. The Eagle Street tower known as "One One One Eagle Street" opened in 2012, receiving national commendations for Commercial Architecture and Sustainable Architecture from the AIA in 2013.

Changes have been made to Riverside Centre to adapt to changing business needs. Such changes have generally been sympathetic to the original design and of a high quality, frequently undertaken with the assistance of Harry Seidler and Associates. Fit-outs in the office tower and plaza buildings have regularly changed to suit new tenants, including remodelling of the ASX floors and the installation of river-facing windows in the formerly windowless lower levels. Michael's restaurant remained in the north-east plaza for 21 years. Friday's remains in the south plaza, operated by Weller Hotels and Tavern until 2018. A coffee shop was added to the foyer in 2007, while in 2008 the Calder tapestries were replaced by a Robert Owen piece, HAZE (Spectrum Shift), and Sydney Ball's October Fields in 2016 (commissioned by Harry Seidler and Associates, selected by Penelope Seidler and recommended by Greg Holman). Seidler was an admirer of Owen, and Ball's works had been used in other Seidler towers. The foyer was refurbished in 2016, including new entry doors, cafe fit-out, reception desk and new furniture and digital tenancy directory installed. The Eagle Street canopy was reglazed, with advice and guidance from Harry Seidler and Associates. The office elevators were remodelled and modernised in 2016–2018, receiving an international award in 2019.

Fit-outs in the plaza eateries were also changed for new occupants in the 21st century, and the north-west plaza was converted to a tavern in 2003. In 2002, the owner of the Pig-n-Whistle tavern chain announced plans for a $3.4 - $4 million fit-out in the north-west plaza building, including the addition of an external covered area, a downstairs keg room and storage area. The signage and fencing for the tavern fit-out became the subject of a copyright (moral rights) case. The case was settled out of court. Riverfront restaurants, fronting the boardwalk, were opened in 2008 in the space set aside for the riverfront road (The Groove Train in the north-east plaza and Jellyfish in the south plaza). New glass awnings were installed on the plaza buildings in 2006, and a second storey was added to the north-east plaza in 2008, both designed by Harry Seidler and Associates' Greg Holman. The plaza was relandscaped in 2016, receiving an award from the Australia Institute of Landscape Architects Queensland for its "respectful" but not "subservient" response to the "iconic building" in 2018.

The ferry terminal fabric was replaced in 2003, though original fabric was left in the waiting area, including a granite seat and sign, and remains in use in 2023. The marina was reduced at the same time and removed in 2017.

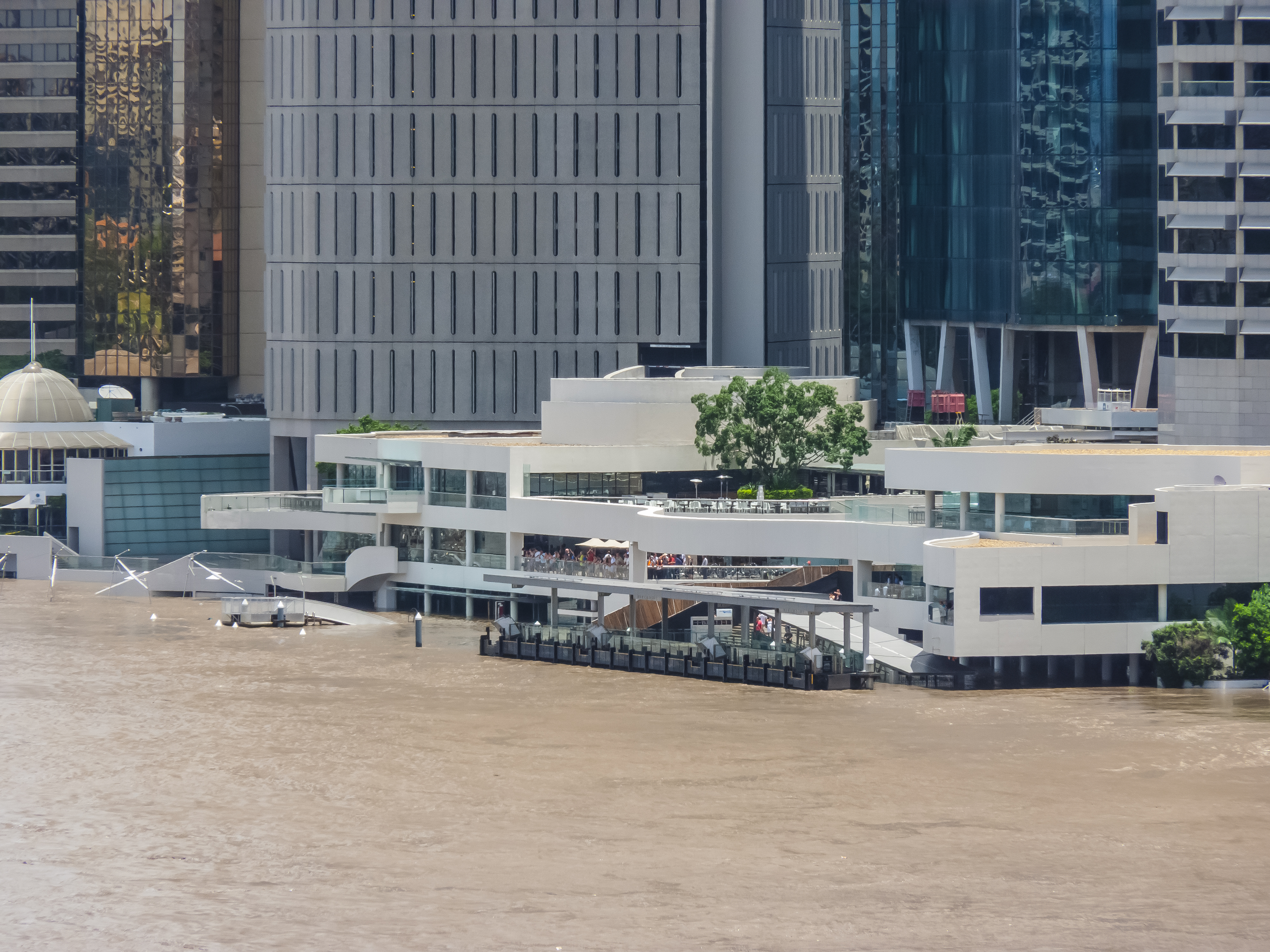
2011 floods at the Riverside Centre

The complex was evacuated during the January 2011 floods. The carpark remained closed for a month, and the two boardwalk restaurants were refitted. The boardwalk restaurants were again inundated in the February 2022 flood and refitted.

On 28 July 2023, the place's owner received development approval for the partial demolition of two levels of existing basement car park and full demolition of the existing low-scale buildings located at the northern end of the site to facilitate the reconfiguration of the basement car parking areas and additional bicycle parking and servicing areas and the construction of a 26-storey office building with retail uses provided at the lower levels.

== Description ==
Riverside Centre (completed 1986) is an office tower complex located at the north-eastern edge of Brisbane central business district (CBD). It includes an office tower, public plaza, plaza buildings, and a section of a riverside promenade known as the Riverwalk. The 1.35ha site fronts Eagle Street to its north-west and the Brisbane River to its south-east, and its other (north-east and south-west) sides are bounded by high-rise commercial and mixed-use buildings. Standing within Brisbane's Golden Triangle precinct, the complex employs cohesive Modernist design principles and makes a notable contribution to the cityscape.

The complex is laid out with the 40-storey office tower standing centrally on the site's western (Eagle Street) edge, with a low-rise, mixed-use plaza building (fronting the Brisbane River to the south of the office tower) and a public plaza that steps down towards the river. The office tower's triangular form maximises views out to the river. The Riverwalk runs along the length of the site's river edge and extends over the water. Under the pFlaza are two levels of underground car parking and service areas.

Riverside Centre contributes to the vista of the Brisbane CBD skyline from the Brisbane River (Town Reach), Kangaroo Point and the Story Bridge. Its riverfront siting, distinctive forms and surrounding open and low-rise plaza setting accentuate the place within this view.

=== Office tower ===
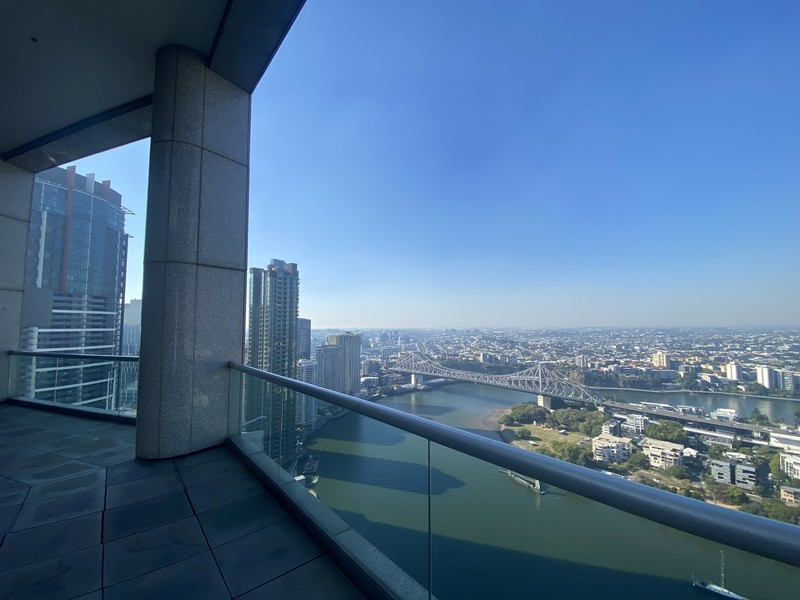
View of Brisbane River from a corner "sky terrace" on the top floor, 2023

The office tower's triangular plan form with rounded corners is orientated so that one side of the building faces Eagle Street to the north-west, and two sides face north-east and south-east to largely unobscured views up and down the Brisbane River. The 40-storey concrete structure has two basement levels and a tall foyer occupying the entire ground floor at the plaza level.

The office tower's exterior is a grid of grey granite stone cladding and large banks of fixed windows shielded on the north-east and north-west sides by external metal sunshades. The grid is interrupted by "sky terraces" (recessed open-air balconies) at various locations on the river-fronting (south and north-east) elevations of the building, accessed via some offices. The building has a flat roof, with the top storey externally expressed by having fewer windows and housing the largest "sky terrace", expanding along the eastern corner. The office tower exterior has a strong, clear form and a graphic aesthetic quality depicting Modernist principles.

The base of the building (formed by the foyer level and two mezzanine levels above (known as levels 5 and 6; former Brisbane Stock Exchange) has a solid and heavy exterior appearance. Clad with polished granite stone, this solid form melds at the ground level into two massive hyperboloid columns at either end of the Eagle Street elevation. These columns frame the building's entrance, which is further emphasised by an undulating, metal-framed glass canopy. The base's other sides have regularly spaced columns, between which are enclosures of tall frameless glass.

The exterior of the building is highly intact, with minor changes including: windows cut into the eastern corner of levels 5 and 6, the removal of the original main entrance doors and replacement in the same location to a larger design, and the removal and replacement of secondary access doors. Tenancy branding, including at the top of the building and at the front entrance, are regularly updated.

The building's main entrance is from the plaza from Eagle Street, with secondary entrances from the plaza on the other sides. The foyer is approximately 15m in height and wraps around the central, triangular, structural service core. Its off-form concrete ceiling features a pattern of exposed radiating and concentric-curved rib beams. The glass foyer walls undulate inwards at the eastern end of the building to accommodate and overlook an exterior water feature in the plaza. The foyer ceiling lowers on the north-east and south sides of the building, under the former Brisbane Stock Exchange. Between these levels, a cantilevered concrete stair with travertine stone-lined balustrades overlooks the foyer below. The former Brisbane Stock Exchange has been converted to open-plan office tenancies and the originally open mezzanines at the north-west end have been enclosed with glass.

Above the base of the building, repeated concrete floor plates feature open-plan office spaces, supported on a central, triangular, structural service core, with concrete columns at the building's outer edges. The structural service core contains services such as banks of lifts, fire stairs, services ducts and toilets. The lift heights are staggered, culminating at low, mid and high levels with crossover lift lobbies. Plant rooms are on levels 16, 17, 40 and the rooftop, containing modern equipment. To each level, the central structural service core is surrounded by an approximately 12.5m wide ring of open-plan office space, unimpeded by columns. Tenancy fit-outs (such as partitions, floor surfaces, lighting, furniture, fixtures and fittings) are non-structural and were designed to be changed by respective tenants. No substantial original interior fit-outs to these levels survive. Some alterations to the floor plates have been made to connect and disconnect multi-floor tenancies via stairs, voids and enclosures.

Panoramic views up and down the river are available from all levels of the triangular office tower as a result of its form, the surrounding open space plaza, and the lowset nature of the plaza buildings.

=== Plaza ===
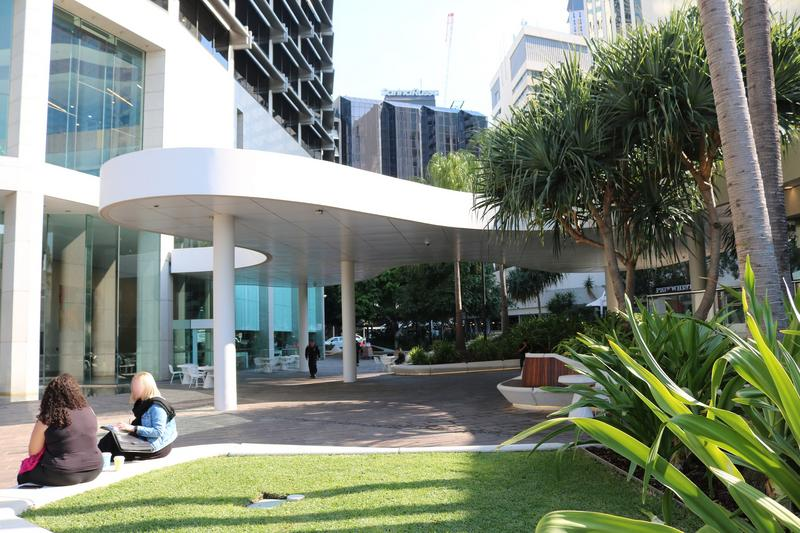
Plaza with walkway canopy looking toward Eagle Street, 2023

The plaza surrounding the office tower provides a pedestrian thoroughfare from Eagle Street at the west end of the site, stepping down to the Riverwalk and Brisbane River at the east. The plaza is an open, largely uncovered space, providing for a public thoroughfare across the site, and for access into the office tower and three plaza buildings. The open space of the plaza allows for views of the office tower from the ground plane, and for the office tower to access light and air. While new landscaping has been added, some original plants and planter beds have been retained and / or remain in early locations.

At its east end, the plaza features a curved walkway canopy supported by round columns. A water feature extends into the east corner of the office tower, and cascades down to a pond at the Riverwalk level, following the steps of the adjacent curved stairs and stair / ramp (referred to as a stramp). It has a row of fountains in the upper pond (adjacent to the office tower) and is crossed by the plaza flooring at this level (the crossing has been widened). Views of the river, framed by a raised curvilinear beam, become apparent at this side of the plaza.

=== South plaza building ===
The low-rise south plaza building stands within the plaza at the south-east end of the site. It features curved wall forms and a flat roof. Views of the river are obtained from its balconies / terraces and large window openings

The three storey building features a food court on the central/ground floor (aligned with and accessed via the upper plaza level), and a restaurant / bar on the first floor. Its length has been reduced, with the western portion of the building removed to accommodate 111 Eagle Street (c. 2007-09). An external north-eastern stair and an internal north-western stair provide access between the ground and first floors. Each level features unroofed balconies / terraces and large glass openings to the east and south-east sides, overlooking the plaza, river and Story Bridge. A semi-circular plant room extends above the first floor.

Large circular planter beds on the north-west side of the building have low concrete walls with polished grey granite caps. A circular floor opening with concrete walls to the upper level is vertically aligned with the ground floor planter bed, providing light and growth-space to the plants below.

The lower (Riverwalk) level's former void space enclosure for a proposed river road has been opened for a restaurant fit-out.

=== Riverwalk ===
The Riverwalk is a mostly uncovered footpath that extends over the river along the south-east side of the site. Originally terminating at the allotment boundaries, the footpath now connects into a wider route along the river. It has a paved floor finish, and concrete bollards with large metal chains along the water's edge.

=== Views ===
The complex forms part of the recognisable cityscape vista of Brisbane CBD that can be viewed from the Story Bridge, Kangaroo Point and the up and down the Town Reach stretch of the Brisbane River.

== Heritage listing ==
Riverside Centre was listed on the Queensland Heritage Register on 1 December 2023 having satisfied the following criteria.

The place is useful for demonstrating the evolution or pattern of Queensland's history.

Riverside Centre (1986) is useful for demonstrating the evolution of the built environment of the central business district (CBD) of Queensland's capital, Brisbane, in the late 20th century. Created as development company Lend Lease's principal commercial development project for Australia in the 1980s, and designed by architect Harry Seidler AC OBE (1923–2006) of Harry Seidler and Associates, Riverside Centre is an example of the usual office tower development undertaken during that period in Queensland. Built at the peak of a boom in office tower construction in Brisbane; designed by one of Australia's most well known architects; and incorporating an office tower integrated with a large, publicly oriented plaza, and recreational and entertainment facilities, in a riverfront setting, Riverside Centre in its form, fabric and accomplished architectural design, is a distinctive example of a high-rise office tower development from this period in Queensland.

The place is important in demonstrating the principal characteristics of a particular class of cultural places.

Riverside Centre's office tower is important in demonstrating the principal characteristics of a high-rise office tower built in the late 20th century in Queensland, being an exceptional example of this class of place. This exceptionality is evident in its high-quality, awarded and architecturally recognised design by a renowned architect for one of Australia's largest development construction companies. The principal characteristics demonstrated at the place are its: prestressed concrete structure, multistorey construction (over 11 storeys) comprising repeated floor plates and a structural service core; modular exterior cladding and glazing; foyer providing centralised access; internal public spaces and surfaces finished with high quality materials, and flexible office floor plates designed to allow for individual tenancy fit-outs. While the tower's tenancy fit-outs have changed, as designed for in a commercial building of this type, the building retains a high degree of architectural integrity. Designed by renowned architect Harry Seidler AC OBE of Harry Seidler and Associates, the latter of which has remained involved with changes to the place since its completion, and as property developer Lend Lease's principal commercial development project in Australia during the 1980s, the tower's outstanding design quality has been widely recognised in Queensland and Australia through ongoing acknowledgement in publications and through accolades given by the architectural profession.

The place is important because of its aesthetic significance.

Because of its architectural quality, Riverside Centre, demonstrates a unified Modernist design principle

The visually striking office tower's beautiful attributes are demonstrated through its well-composed symmetrical and sculptural triangular form, repetitive facade treatments of uniform dimensions, and impressive foyer incorporating modern artwork. The office tower's centrality to and cohesiveness with the remainder of the place, in particular the surrounding plaza space, is emphasised by the well detailed, high-quality materials throughout (including large expanses of glass and stone), the floor strip finishes that radiate from the office tower's foyer out through the plaza, and the open setting established by the plaza and low-rise south plaza building. The design, forms and layout of the Riverside Centre have impressive aesthetic qualities, notably through the juxtaposition between the office tower's form and the expressive curvilinear forms of the cantilevered entrance canopy, south plaza building, and landscaped plaza (including stairs, sinuous walkway canopy, water feature that provides a visual link between the office tower and river, and curvilinear beam), and through the place's strong visual and physical connection with the Brisbane River.

Through the office tower's riverfront siting, distinctive form and surrounding open plaza and low-rise plaza buildings, its attributes make a notable contribution to the cityscape vista of Brisbane CBD along the Town Reach of the Brisbane River, and from Kangaroo Point and the Story Bridge (Story Bridge).

The place is important in demonstrating a high degree of creative or technical achievement at a particular period.

Riverside Centre, through its outstanding architectural excellence, is important in demonstrating a high degree of creative achievement in the late 20th century. Designed by renowned architect Harry Seidler AC OBE of Harry Seidler and Associates, the qualities of the place have been repeatedly recognised in architectural publications, critique and awards since its construction; most notably with the Royal Australian Institute of Architects (RAIA) (Qld)'s award for Best Building in 1987, the RAIA's national Sir Zelman Cowen Award for Public Architecture in 1987, the RAIA (Qld)'s Robin Dods Triennial Medal in 1989, the First Prize in the Marble Architecture Awards (Carrara, Italy) in 1989, and the Australian Institute of Architecture (AIA) Queensland Chapter's "25 Year Award for Enduring Architecture" in 2011. These awards acclaim the Riverside Centre's: outstanding architectural quality; the office tower's refined and rational design (including its form, scale, size, materials and structural system); impressive foyer with quality materials; considered responses to climate (including exterior sunshades tailored to orientation, and sky gardens); well-ordered urban design and the generous, open space of the plaza layout; and the highly regarded physical and visual connection of the place to the Brisbane River.

== See also ==
- Josef Albers (painter and influential teacher: instructor of both Seidler and Carlberg)
- List of tallest buildings in Brisbane
