= Central Plaza =

Central Plaza or Plaza Central (Spanish for "Central Square"), may refer to:

- Central Plaza (Dublin), formerly headquarters of the Central Bank of Ireland
- Central Plaza (Hong Kong), a skyscraper in Hong Kong, China
- Central Plaza (Oklahoma), a shopping mall in Lawton, Texas, United States
- Central Plaza (San Francisco), a skyscraper in San Francisco, United States
- Plaza Central (Texas), a shopping mall in Arlington, Texas, United States
- Central Plaza Complex, in Brisbane, Queensland, Australia
- Plaza Central, former name of Parque Vidal in Santa Clara, Cuba
