= Eagle Street =

Street in Brisbane, Queensland, Australia

Eagle Street at the intersection of Queen Street, 2026

Eagle Street is a major street in the central business district of Brisbane, Queensland, Australia. It runs between Queen Street in the north and Mary Street in the south, and intersects Creek Street, Elizabeth Street and Charlotte Street. Eagle Street serves as Queensland's main financial hub, and is anchored by numerous banks, insurance companies and corporate headquarters. The Golden Triangle is an area of the Brisbane CBD bounded by Edward Street, Adelaide Street and the Brisbane River, with Eagle Street forming its major arterial spine.

Eagle Street's history began as an early riverside thoroughfare of Brisbane, lined with wharves, warehouses, shipping offices and the Customs House, and served as a hub of commerce, shipping and trade from at least the mid-19th century. The street takes its name from being the main road to Eagle Farm during the convict era.

The post-war era saw the decline of shipping activity and its relocation downstream to Hamilton, and later to the Fisherman Islands. Over the late-20th century, Eagle Street transitioned into a commercial and financial precinct. Wharves and warehouses were replaced by modern skyscrapers, and the street became a hub for banks, insurance firms and corporate offices. Today, Eagle Street is a major white-collar district in Brisbane and connects to the City Reach riverwalk and Eagle Street Pier ferry wharf.

== History ==
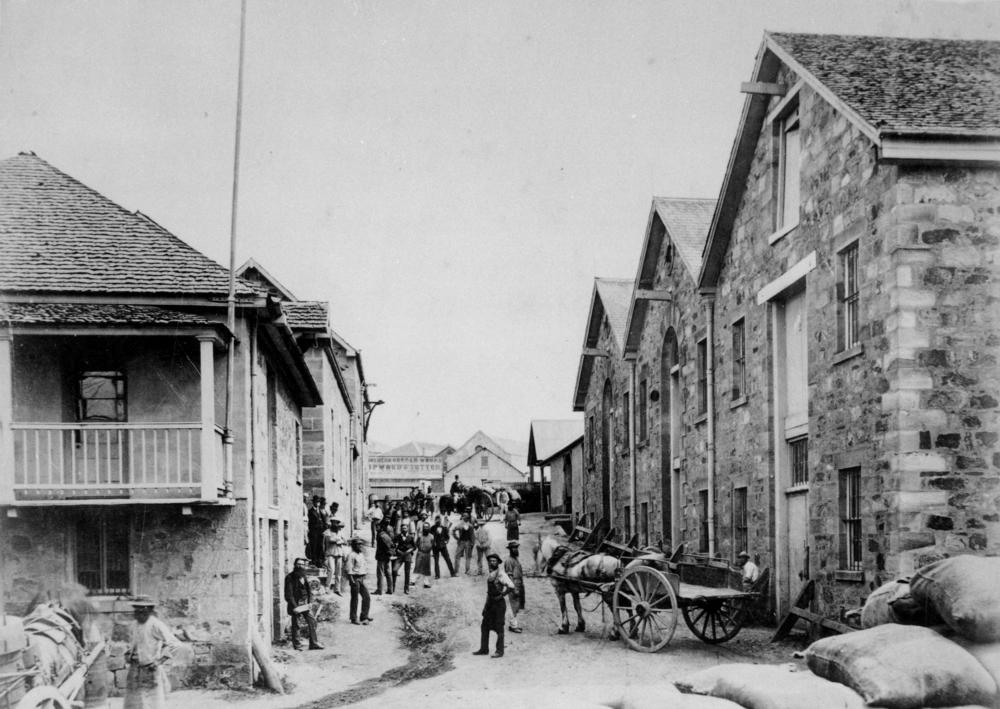
Wharves along the Eagle Street river section, 1880

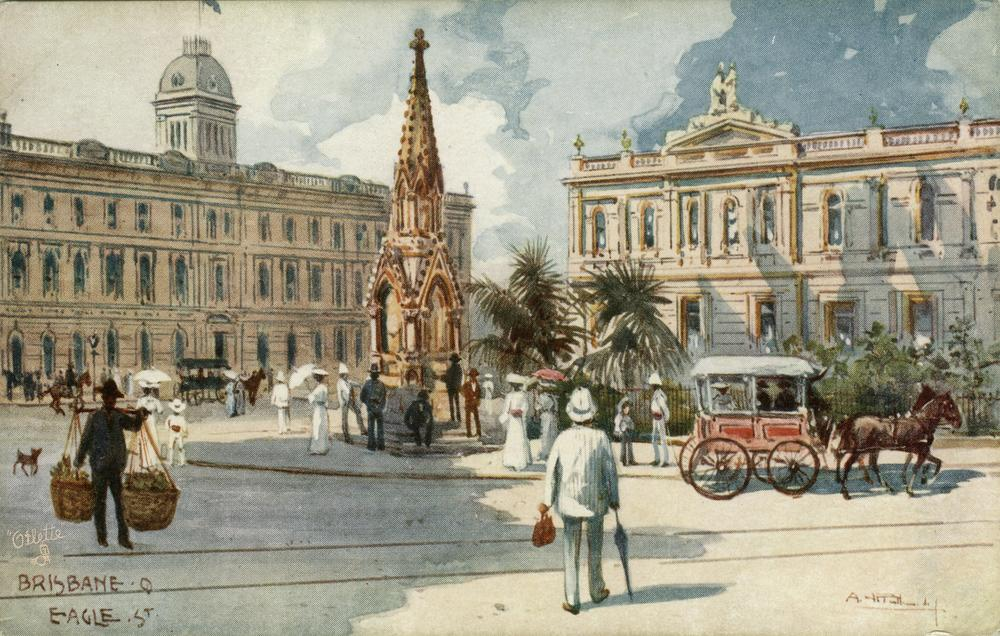
Early view of Eagle Street, 1895

When the convict settlement was established at Moreton Bay in 1824, an initial settlement at Redcliffe failed, and the colony moved in 1825 to a site 27 km upriver, now central Brisbane. The elevated ridge offered protection from floods, fresh water, and fertile ground, but the river's shallow bar, shoals, and meanders complicated navigation for shipping.

The first wharf was erected below the new settlement beside the stone Commissariat Store (1828–29), later named Queen's Wharf. By 1850, multiple wharves had been developed at South Brisbane, though Queen's Wharf remained the only facility adjacent to the town center. Andrew Petrie established a small wharf at Petrie Bight before 1844 to serve the cross-river ferry to Kangaroo Point, spurring local development.

In 1846, William Augustine Duncan became Brisbane's first sub-collector of customs. Despite initial controversy over the location of a customs house, a stone building was erected in 1849–50 at Petrie Bight on the site of the old Petrie wharf, stimulating wharf development nearby. Early wharf construction was primitive, often requiring rebuilding after floods.

By the 1860s, the Queensland Steam Shipping Company had constructed additional wharves, offices, and stores along Eagle Street. Further development included Kennedy Wharf and the creation of Circular Quay, extending wharves downstream. The grand Customs House designed by Charles McLay opened in 1889. Dredging and channel improvements facilitated continued river port activity, while severe floods and maritime strikes periodically disrupted operations. Early cottages along the river were replaced by wharves and warehouses, including properties owned by John Richardson, George Raff, and Thomas Brown & Sons. By the 1870s, Eagle Street had become a busy thoroughfare for heavy traffic servicing the wharves. Infrastructure improvements included culverting Wheat Creek and creating the Eagle Street Fig Tree reserve, which became a social space for workers and draymen.

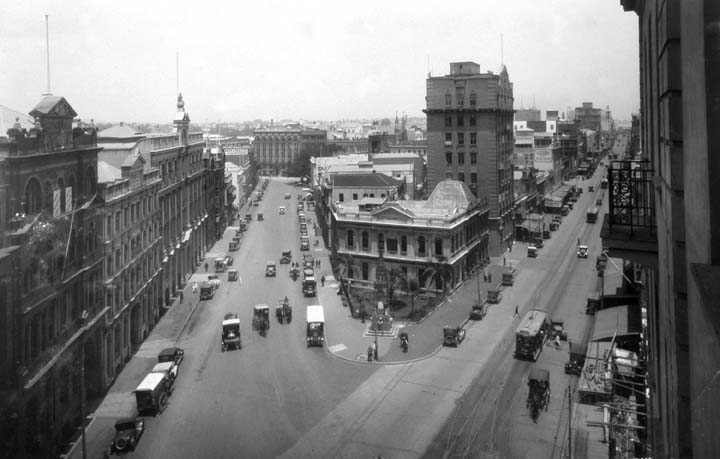
Looking south at the corner of Eagle and Queen Streets, 1926

Following the Great Flood of 1893, long-term improvements to the Brisbane River channel were undertaken under Edward Alexander Cullen, including training walls, dredging, and bank stabilization, ensuring Brisbane's continued viability as a river port.

By the early twentieth century, the Australasian United Steam Navigation Company dominated the Eagle Street wharves, modernising and raising them to reduce flooding. Despite improvements, new wharves downstream at Teneriffe, Newstead, and Pinkenba began a shift in port activity. The construction of the Story Bridge in 1939 further limited upstream shipping, signaling the declining importance of Eagle Street wharves. The street itself underwent modernisation, including tarred surfaces and wooden block paving.

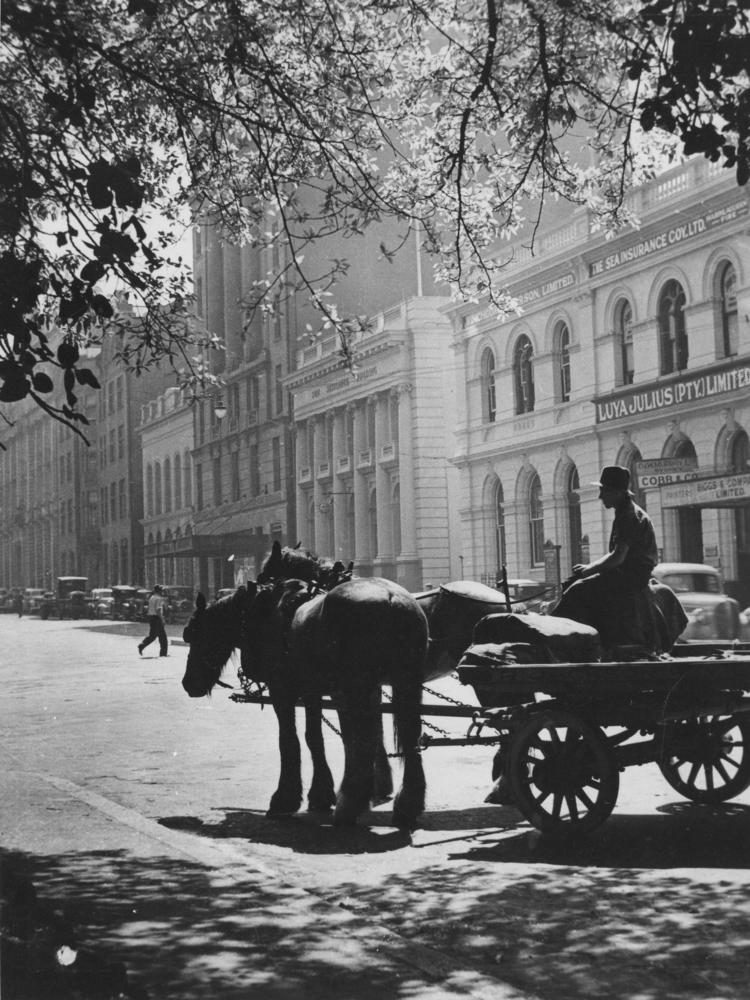
Early morning delivery in Eagle Street, 1940

After 1945, Brisbane's post-war building boom prioritized housing, schools, factories, and hospitals, limiting office construction until 1952. Material shortages further delayed development.

The port of Brisbane continued its downstream movement, with Hamilton becoming the primary wharf district. By the 1960s, Eagle Street's wharves were largely used as carparks, and by 1991 all were demolished. Rezoning from light industrial to general business encouraged the development of a financial district.

The election of Lord Mayor Clem Jones in 1961 accelerated redevelopment. Height restrictions were abolished, enabling construction of skyscrapers such as the fifteen-storey Pearl Assurance Building (1965) and Eagle Towers (1965–66), Brisbane's first building over 61 meters tall. By the completion of Harry Seidler's Riverside Centre in 1987, all pre-1965 buildings on Eagle Street had been demolished.

== Architecture ==
| Address | Building name | Image | Description | Notes |
|---|---|---|---|---|
| 1 Eagle Street | Waterfront Place | | Designed by the architecture firm Cameron Chisholm Nicol, Waterfront Place was completed in 1989 and rises 40 storeys to a height of 162 metres (531 ft) tall. | |
| 71 Eagle Street | Riparian Plaza | | Designed by Harry Seidler and completed in 2005, Riparian Plaza stands at 250 m (820 ft) in height to its communications spire and 200 m (660 ft) to its roof. It was Brisbane's tallest building until it was surpassed by Aurora in 2006 and is one of Brisbane's most notable skyscrapers. In October 2007, Riparian Plaza won the top prize for commercial architecture at the annual national architecture awards. | |
| 111 Eagle Street | One One One Eagle Street | | Designed by Philip Cox, One One One Eagle Street was completed in 2012 and rises 54 storeys to a height of 195 m (640 ft). It is ranked as a 6 star Green Star office design rating. | |
| 123 Eagle Street | Riverside Centre | | Designed by Harry Seidler, the Riverside Centre was completed in 1986, it contains 40 storeys and rises 146 metres (479 ft) above ground. It formerly held the Brisbane Stock Exchange. It was added to the Queensland Heritage Register on 1 December 2023. | |

== See also ==
- Road transport in Brisbane
