= One One One Eagle Street =

194.7-metre (639 ft) office building in Brisbane, Queensland, Australia

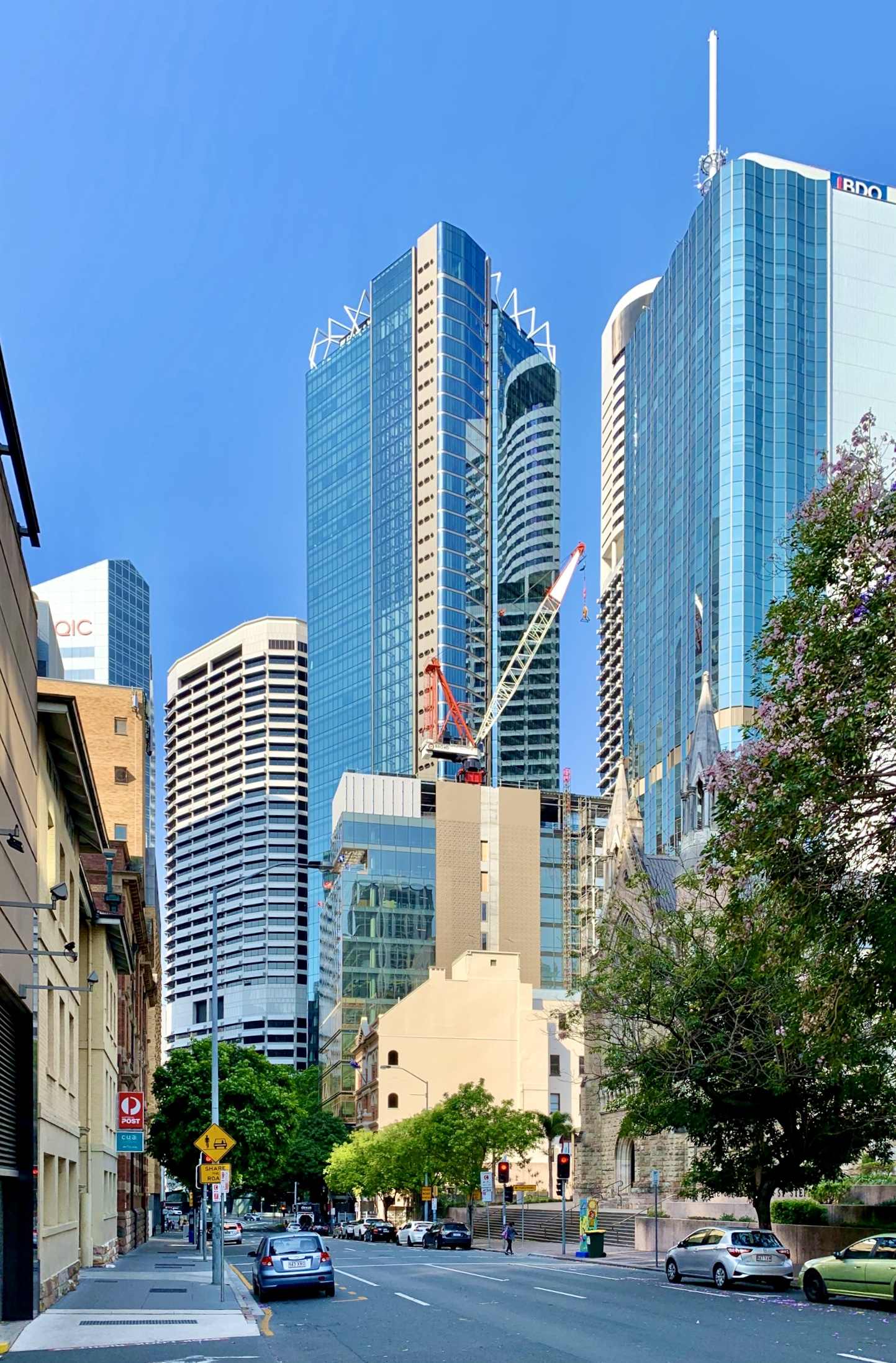
- One One One Eagle Street

General information
- Status: Completed
- Type: Office
- Location: 111 Eagle Street, Brisbane, Queensland
- Coordinates: 27°28′03.33″S 153°01′49.28″E
- Current tenants: Arrow Energy; ANZ Bank; Corrs Chambers Westgarth; Ernst & Young; Gadens; GIS People; Hays; Norton Rose Fulbright; Shell Energy Australia
- Construction started: 2008
- Completed: early 2012
- Opening: 1 August 2012
- Cost: A$700 million

Height
- Roof: 195 m (640 ft)

Technical details
- Structural system: Structural frame
- Material: Steel and glass
- Floor count: 53
- Floor area: 64,264 m^{2} (691,730 sq ft)

Design and construction
- Architect: Philip Cox
- Architecture firm: Cox Rayner
- Developer: GPT Group
- Structural engineer: Arup
- Services engineer: WSP Lincolne Scott
- Main contractor: Leighton Contractors

One One One Eagle Street is a 194.7-metre (639 ft) office building at 111 Eagle Street, Brisbane, Queensland, Australia, located in the city centre. With 6 star Green Star office design rating, the building is part of the CBD's "Golden Triangle" district. Its location is the site of the old Indigo House building, which was demolished over a period of six months starting in 2008. 95% of all waste from the old building is to be recycled or reused.

The site is located between the Riverside Centre and Riparian Plaza buildings. Leighton Contractors constructed the Cox Rayner-designed skyscraper which has 54 floors including 44 levels of premium office space and 115 car parking spaces in the under ground carpark. The building cost $700 million to construct.

== Design ==
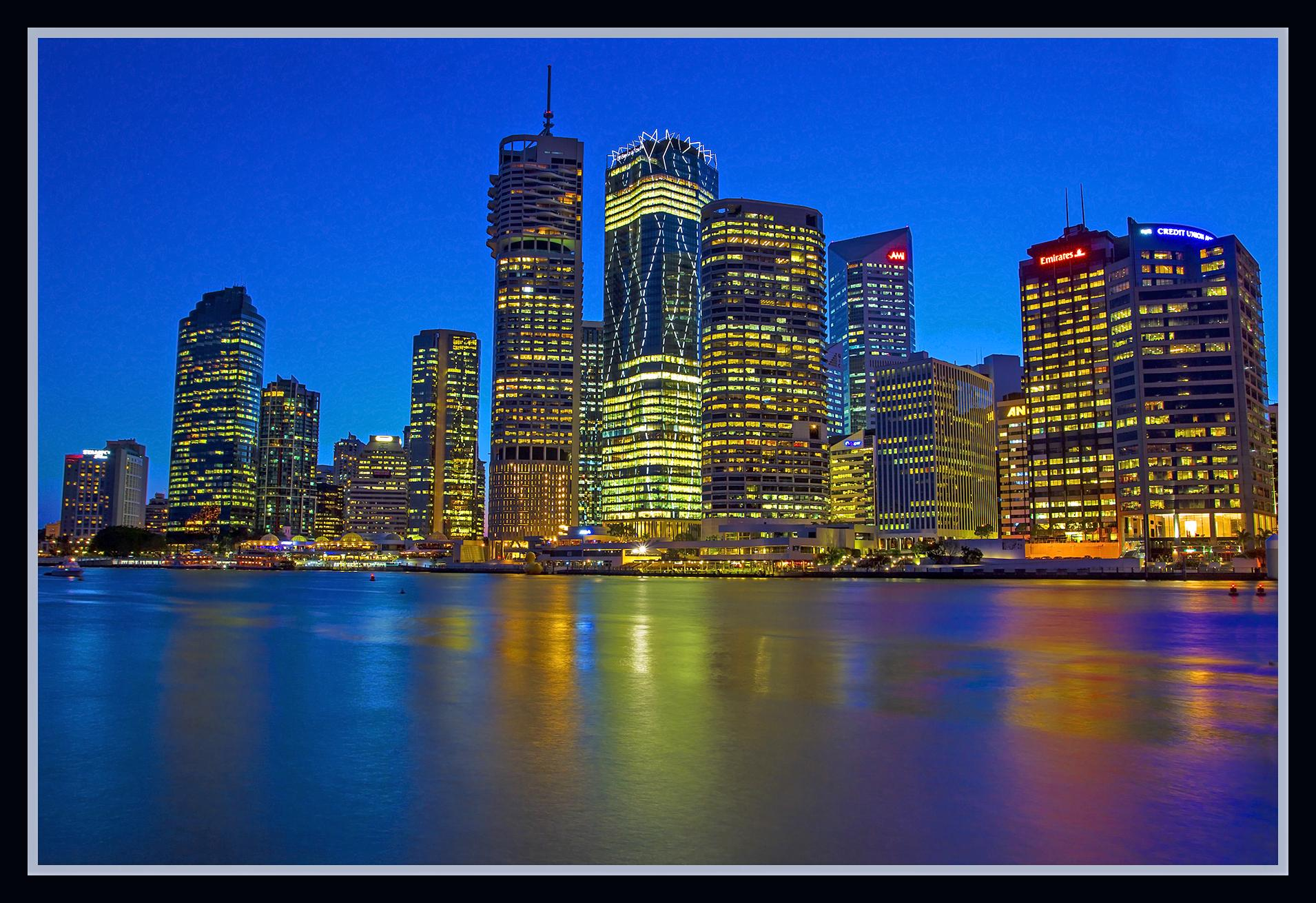
One One One Eagle Street at night (centre) with LED lighting resembling the buttress roots of a Moreton Bay fig tree

The building contains a steel structural frame and was designed by architects Cox Rayner and takes inspiration from nature, with its design based on the algorithm of the way plants grow towards the light. Ceiling heights are 3.1 metres (10 ft) with a fully glazed exterior to maximise views.

One of the major aspects of the building will be its emphasis on sustainability, with features such as gas-fired for on-site power generators, to reduce impact of CO_{2} production, 50% greater ventilation than most Australian office buildings, it also included plans to River Heat Rejection process to reduce strain on the cooling towers as well as saving millions of litres of water, however this to date has not been installed. There is also a proposal for a water recycling plant for the building for waste water management to be used in conjunction with rainwater tanks for use in toilets and irrigation. Blinds will be sensor-activated to trap hot air before pumping it outside.

The outside of the building is furnished with 52,000 LED lights. The lighting design imitates the buttress roots of a Moreton Bay fig tree.

The buildings lobby and ground floor were used in the filming of the 2015 film San Andreas, being used to represent the foyer of a skyscraper in downtown San Francisco.

== Construction ==
The project manager and project director for One One One Eagle Street were Burns Bridge Sweett. Excavation of the basement levels was conducted while the floors above were being constructed, a process referred to as the top-down method. The building's topping out was celebrated on 18 May 2011, with two utilities floors remaining to be completed.

== Tenants ==
Tenants include Arrow Energy, ANZ Bank, Corrs Chambers Westgarth, Ernst & Young, Gadens, Hays, Norton Rose Fulbright and Shell Energy Australia. The first tenants were able to move in from July 2012.

Tenants are provided the services of a commercial concierge.

== See also ==
- List of tallest buildings in Australia
- List of tallest buildings in Brisbane
