= Central Plaza (San Francisco) =

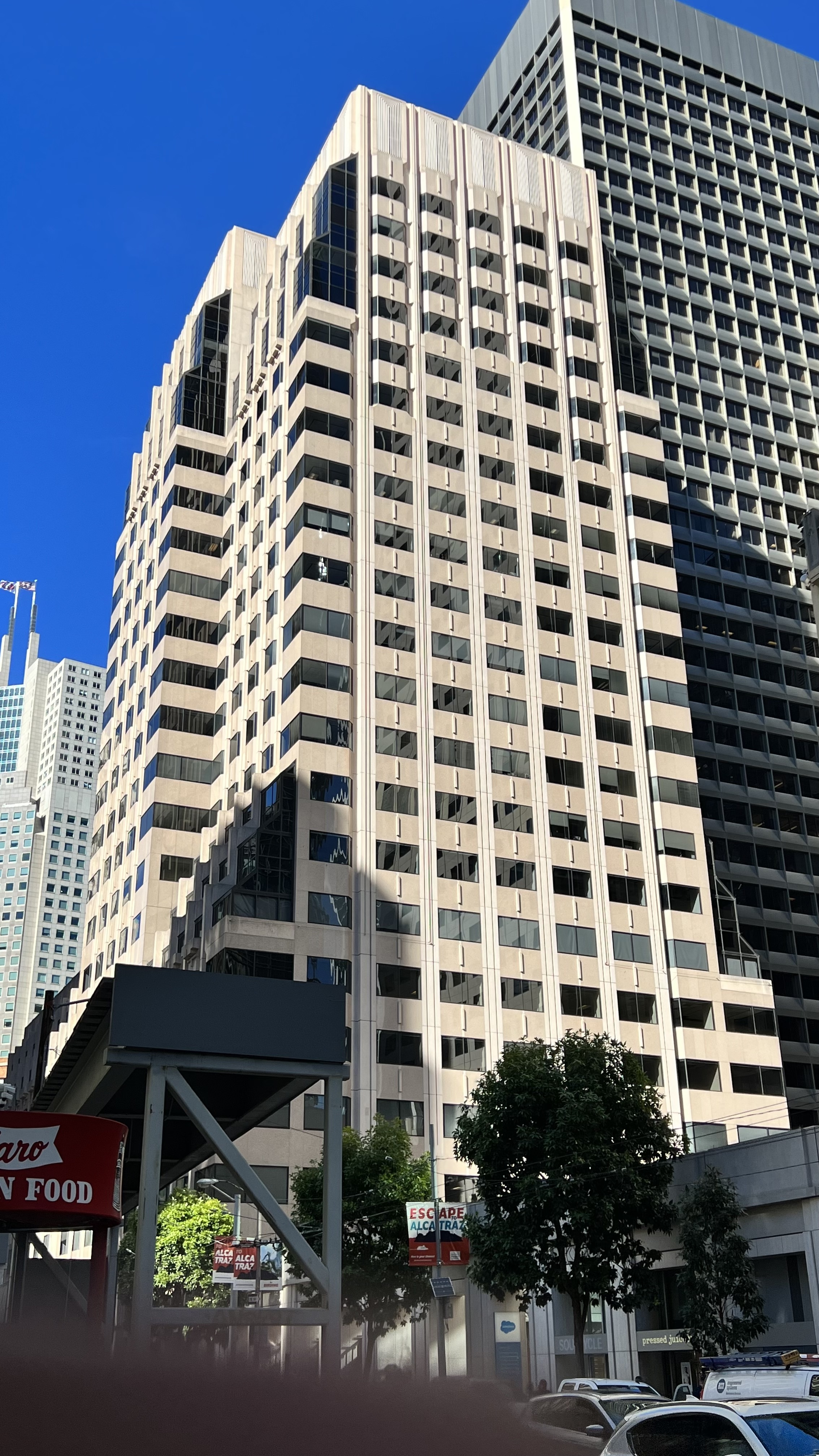

- Location within San Francisco Central Plaza (San Francisco) (California) Central Plaza (San Francisco) (the United States)
- Alternative names: 455 Market Street

General information
- Status: Completed
- Type: Commercial offices
- Architectural style: Modernism
- Location: 455 Market Street; San Francisco, California
- Coordinates: 37.79053°N 122.39916°W
- Completed: 1987
- Management: Cushman & Wakefield

Height
- Roof: 96.93 m (318.0 ft)

Technical details
- Lifts/elevators: 10

Design and construction
- Architect: Kaplan McLaughlin Diaz

Central Plaza is a 23-storey, 96.93 m (318.0 ft) skyscraper at 455 Market and First streets in San Francisco, California.

== Tenants ==
- ACE Group

== See also ==
- San Francisco's tallest buildings
