= Gadens =

Australian law firm

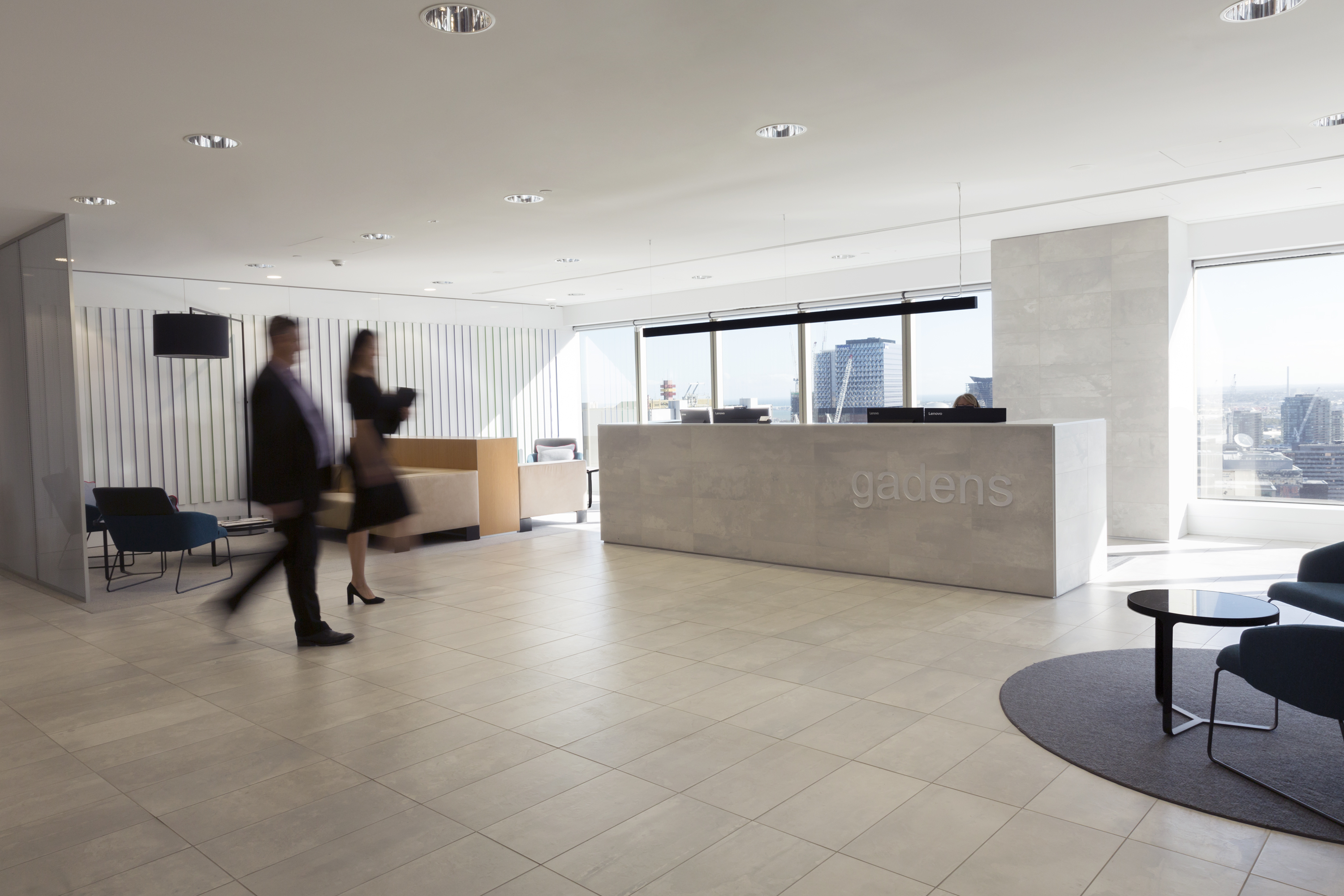
Reception of Gadens in Melbourne

Gadens is an independent Australian law firm that operates across six offices in Sydney, Melbourne, Brisbane, Perth, Canberra, and Adelaide. It has approximately 120 partners and 800 people. It specialises in major projects and infrastructure, corporate and commercial law, property transactions, debt recovery and banking.

== History ==
Gadens' history dates back to 1847, making it one of the oldest firms in Australia along with Allens, MinterEllison, Mallesons, and Clayton Utz, which all have their origins in the first half of the nineteenth century.

It was the first Australian law firm to establish a multi-disciplinary practice.

In 2015, Gadens allied with US/China giant Dentons and Singapore firm Rodyk & Davidson to share branding, strategy and information technology. In 2016, Gadens split when its then Sydney and Perth offices joined Dentons. Since that time, the Sydney office of Gadens has been rebuilt and now comprises more than 240 people. That office is located at 8 Chifley Square, adjacent to Martin Place, in the Sydney CBD.
