= Creek Street, Brisbane =

Major road in Brisbane, Australia

Creek Street Queensland
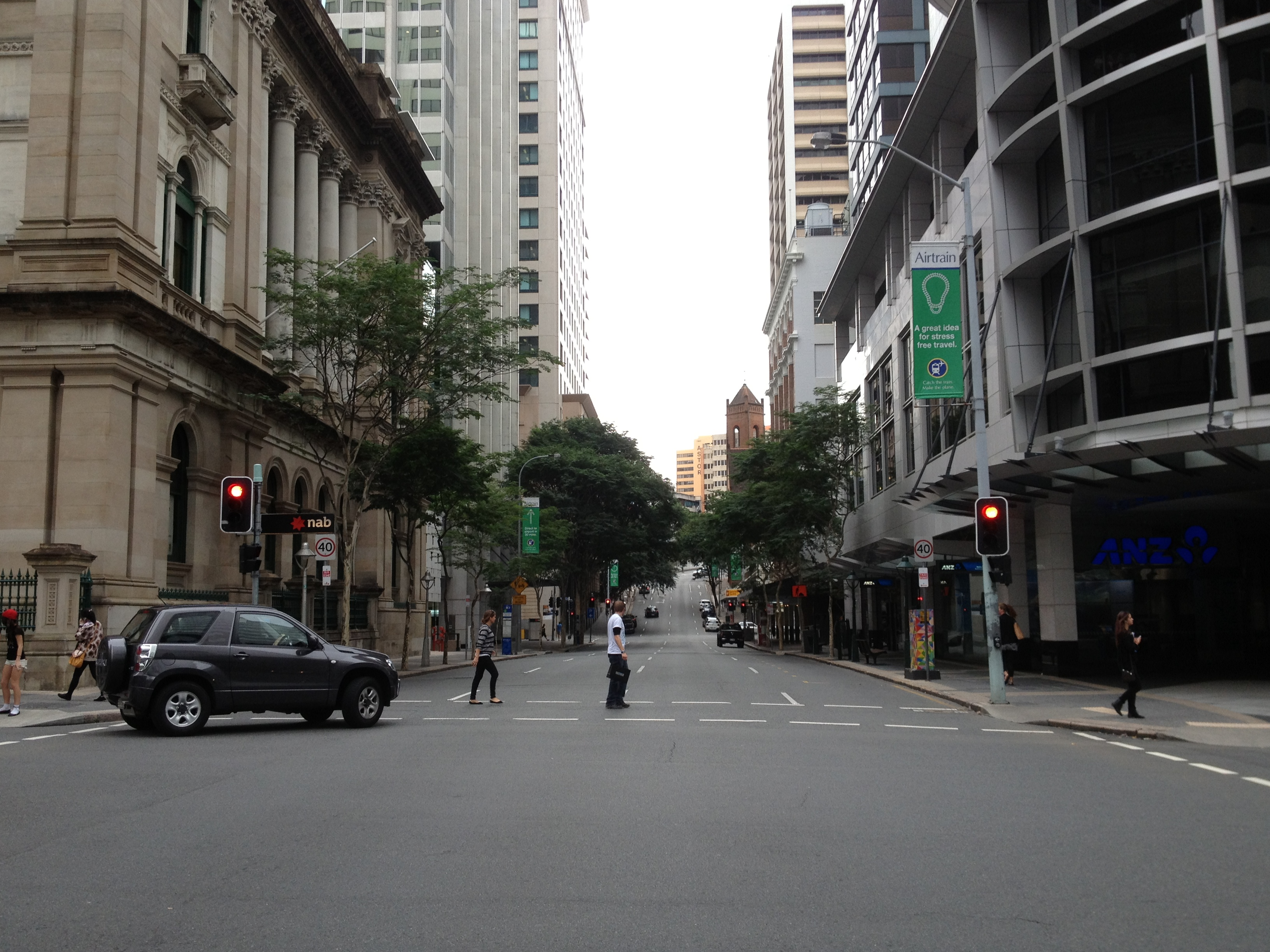
- Creek Street from Queen Street intersection.
- Coordinates: 27.466456°S 153.028086°E

General information
- Type: Street
- Location: Brisbane

Creek Street is a major street in the central business district of Brisbane, Queensland, Australia. The street follows a one–way south–north direction, starting at the intersection of Charlotte and Eagle streets, and cutting through Elizabeth Street, Queen Street, Adelaide Street and Ann Street before coming to an end at Turbot Street in the northern end of the CBD. Creek Street was named for the infilled creek over which it was constructed, and is an exception to the convention of parallel streets in the CBD being named after male royals.

== History ==
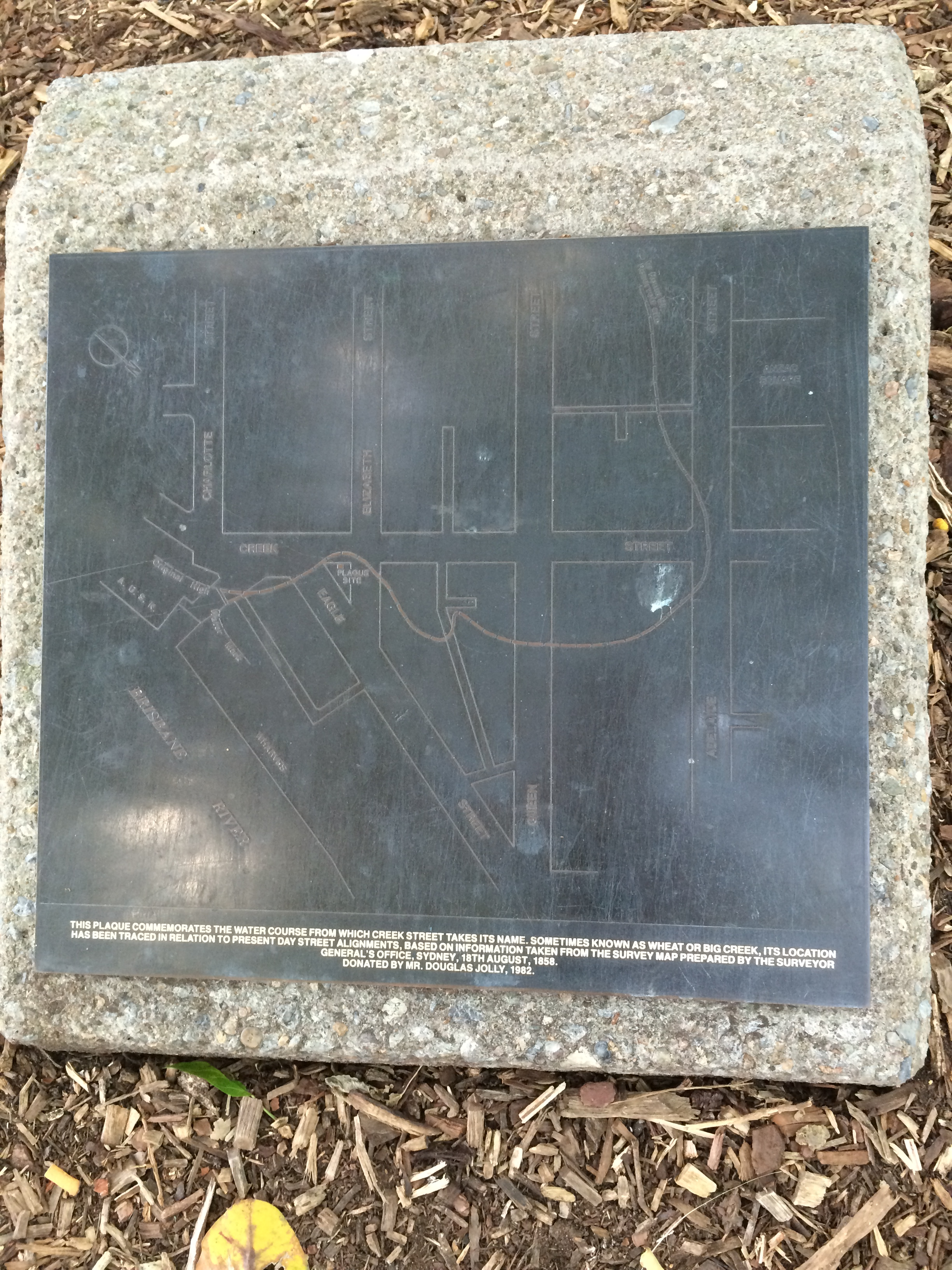
Map showing the route of the now-underground creek which gives Creek Street, Brisbane, its name, 2015

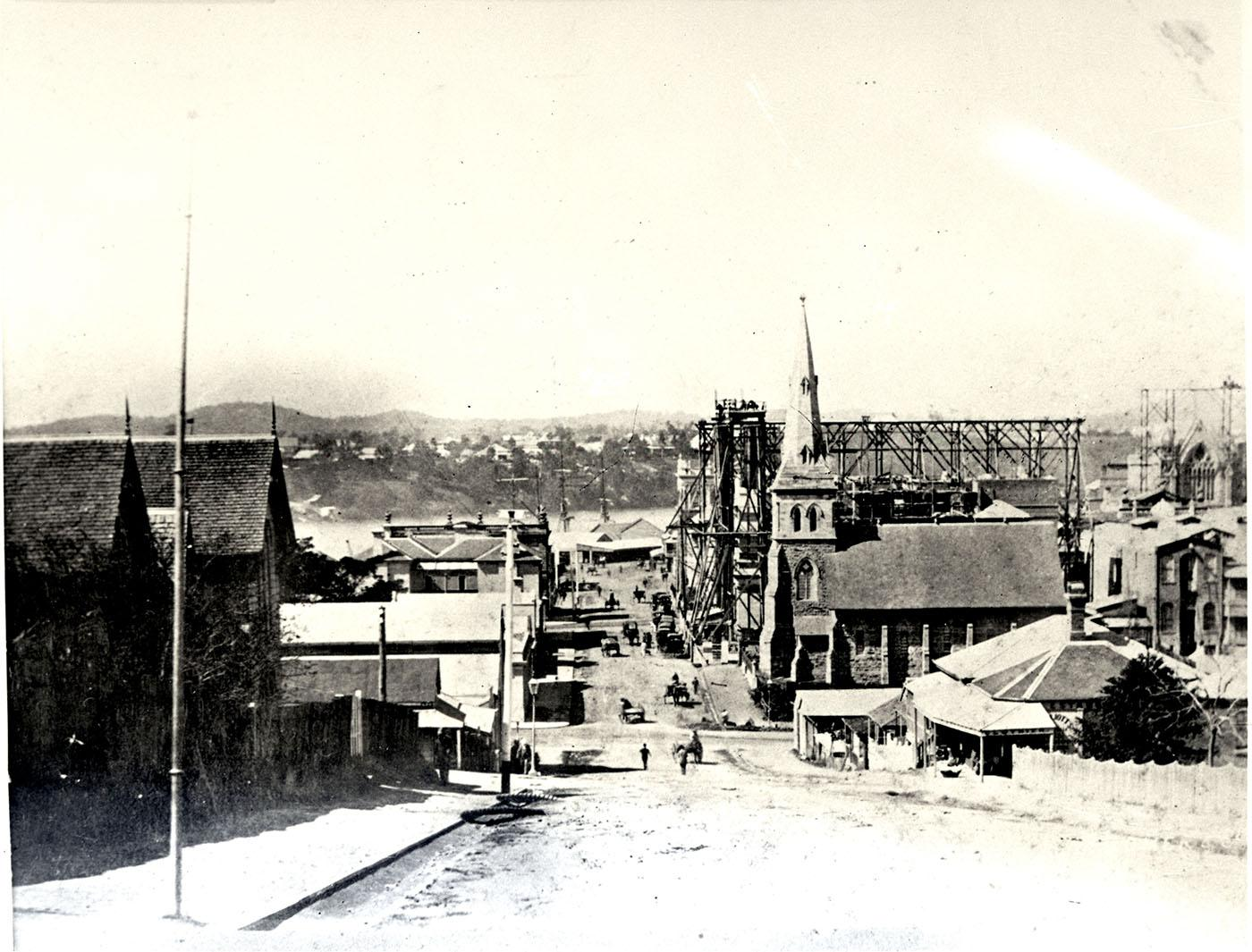
Creek Street, looking towards the Brisbane River, 1883

In 2008, it was announced that the Brisbane City Council was going to convert the street into a two-way road to improve traffic flow in the CBD as part of its Town Reach project. Doubts emerged later in the year due to cost blowouts and traffic planners questioning the new design's effectiveness. After traffic tests proved the new design was not feasible, the plan was put on hold indefinitely.

== Heritage listings ==
Creek Street has a number of heritage-listed sites, including:

- 131 Creek Street (27.4655°S 153.0275°E): St Andrews Uniting Church
- 308 Queen Street (corner of Creek Street) (27.467°S 153.0282°E): National Australia Bank
- Eagle Street (corner of Creek Street) (27.4677°S 153.0296°E): Eagle Street Fig Trees

== Financial district ==
The street is part of the emerging financial district known as the "Golden Triangle". The street is lined with a wall of skyscrapers of 100m or more in height including:

- Comalco Place
- Central Plaza 1 (27.46706°S 153.0291117°E)
- NAB House

== Major intersections ==
- Charlotte Street
- Eagle Street
- Elizabeth Street
- Queen Street
- Adelaide Street
- Ann Street
- Turbot Street
- Wickham Terrace

== See also ==
- Alice Street
- Margaret Street
