= Eagle Street Fig Trees =

Heritage-listed group of trees in Brisbane, Queensland

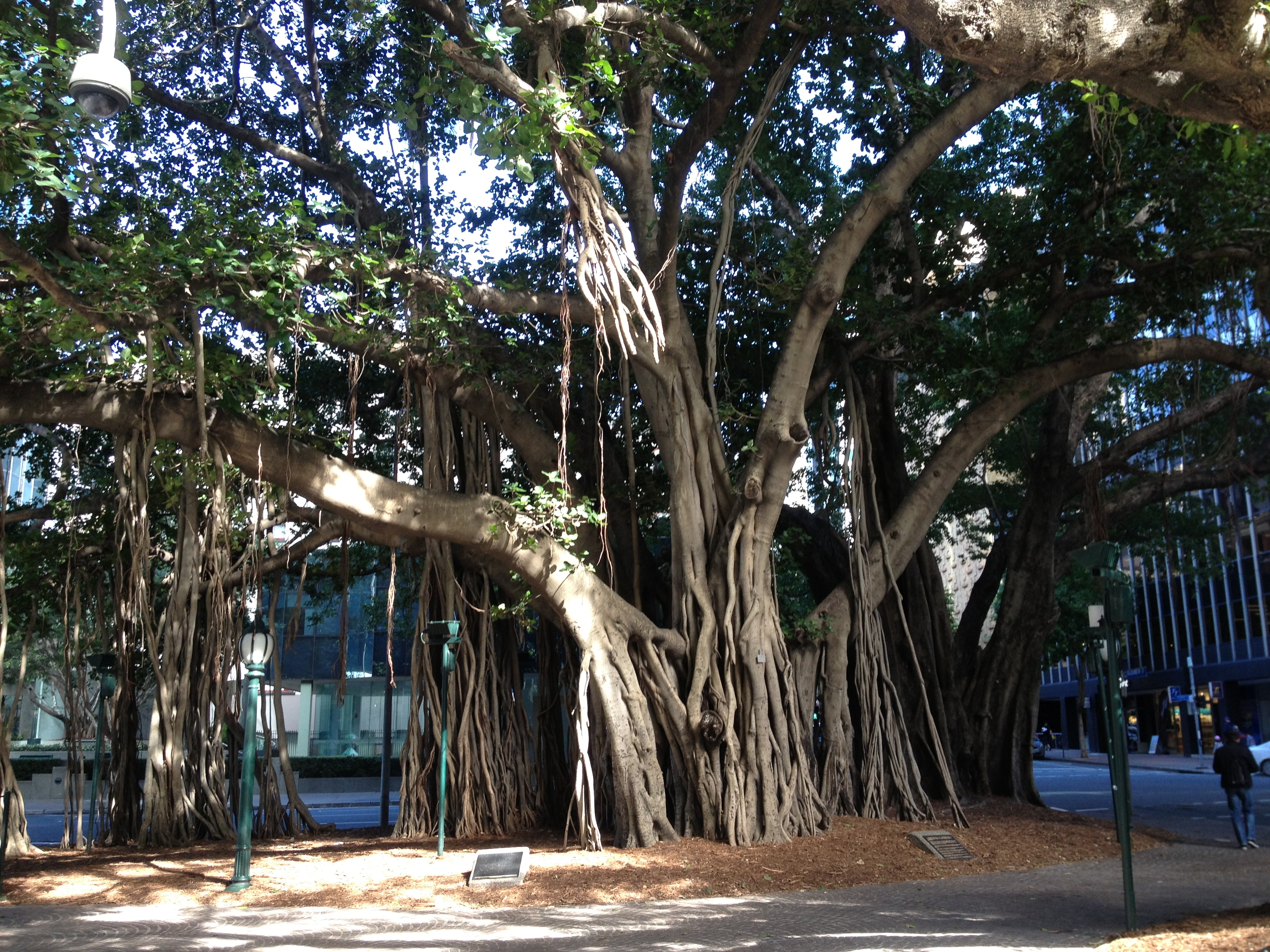
- Eagle Street Fig Trees, 2013

- Location within Queensland Location within Australia
- 27.4677°S 153.0296°E
- Location: 118A Eagle Street, Brisbane City, City of Brisbane, Queensland, Australia

History
- Design period: 1870s–1890s (late 19th century)
- Built: c.1889; 137 years ago

Queensland Heritage Register
- Official name: Eagle Street Fig Trees, Fig Tree Reserve, Plantation Reserve
- Type: state heritage (landscape)
- Designated: 13 May 2004
- Reference no.: 602440
- Significant period: c. 1889 (historical)
- Significant components: plaque
- Gardener: Walter Hill

Eagle Street Fig Trees is a heritage-listed group of trees at 118A Eagle Street, Brisbane City, City of Brisbane, Queensland, Australia. They were planted c. 1889 by Walter Hill. It is also known as Fig Tree Reserve and Plantation Reserve. It was added to the Queensland Heritage Register on 13 May 2004.

== History ==
The small triangular reserve at the intersection of Eagle, Elizabeth and Creek Streets was granted to the (North) Brisbane Municipal Council by Queen Victoria, signed by the Governor of Queensland, Sir Henry Wylie Norman, on 16 May 1889.

It was gazetted on 17 May 1889 as, "745 Folio 210 101/11 perches... Reserve for Plantation, urinal etc. only and for no other purpose whatsoever... Rent: 1 peppercorn per year if demanded by the Queen Victoria and her heirs forever. Mineral Rights reserved by the Crown." The land could be resumed if these conditions were not observed.

Walter Hill planted the three fig trees located on the site. He was appointed Brisbane's first superintendent of the Brisbane Botanic Gardens in 1855 and remained a key figure in the management of the Gardens until 1881.

Public toilets were constructed on the reserve but were removed in the 1970s. The area has been paved, and 19th-century reproduction light fittings have been installed, as well as facilities such as garbage containers and seats.

== Description ==
The reserve is a triangular island located at the intersection of Eagle, Elizabeth and Creek Streets. The site, consisting of a partially paved and landscaped area, is dominated by the huge fig trees that provide a striking visual effect in the business precinct of the Eagle Street area.

The reserve is planted with three fig trees, two White Figs (Ficus virens) and one Banyan Fig (Ficus benghalensis). The branches of the Banyan Figs are supported with prop roots that develop from the aerial roots that are produced to gather moisture from the atmosphere. The White Fig is taller than the Banyan and has pale green foliage which first appears as a shade of pink or bronze. This species is found occurring naturally in Queensland and throughout tropical Asia.

There are two interpretive bronze plaques located on site. The first of the bronze plaques is mounted on a small plinth and contains an engraved inscription. The inscription describes the natural features of the site as it was in 1889, the history of the site prior to 1889 and the role it played in the commercial activities of the area. The second plaque contains a map showing the course of the creek that originally flowed through the site.

== Heritage listing ==
Eagle Street Fig Trees was listed on the Queensland Heritage Register on 13 May 2004 having satisfied the following criteria.

The place is important in demonstrating the evolution or pattern of Queensland's history.

The Eagle Street Fig Trees are important in demonstrating the evolution or pattern of Queensland's history. The Fig Trees or "Plantation Reserve" is important because it survives as a remnant of the development of the area during the first half of the nineteenth century. Early photographs of the area show rows of horse and carts lined up to service the wharf area and adjacent warehouses. The area was established as a Reserve in the late 19th century to provide an area for the carriers to rest and refresh themselves amidst an area of high activity.

The place demonstrates rare, uncommon or endangered aspects of Queensland's cultural heritage.

As a representative of a mid-Victorian era Reserve, the Eagle Street Fig Trees demonstrate rare, uncommon or endangered aspects of Queensland's cultural heritage. Located in a busy trading precinct, the Eagle Street Fig Trees provided workmen with respite from the hectic wharf trading area. The Fig Trees have retained this function in their current setting.

The place is important because of its aesthetic significance.

The Eagle Street Fig Trees have landmark value at the intersection of several major streets in Brisbane's central business district and provide shade and visual amenity.

== Plaques ==
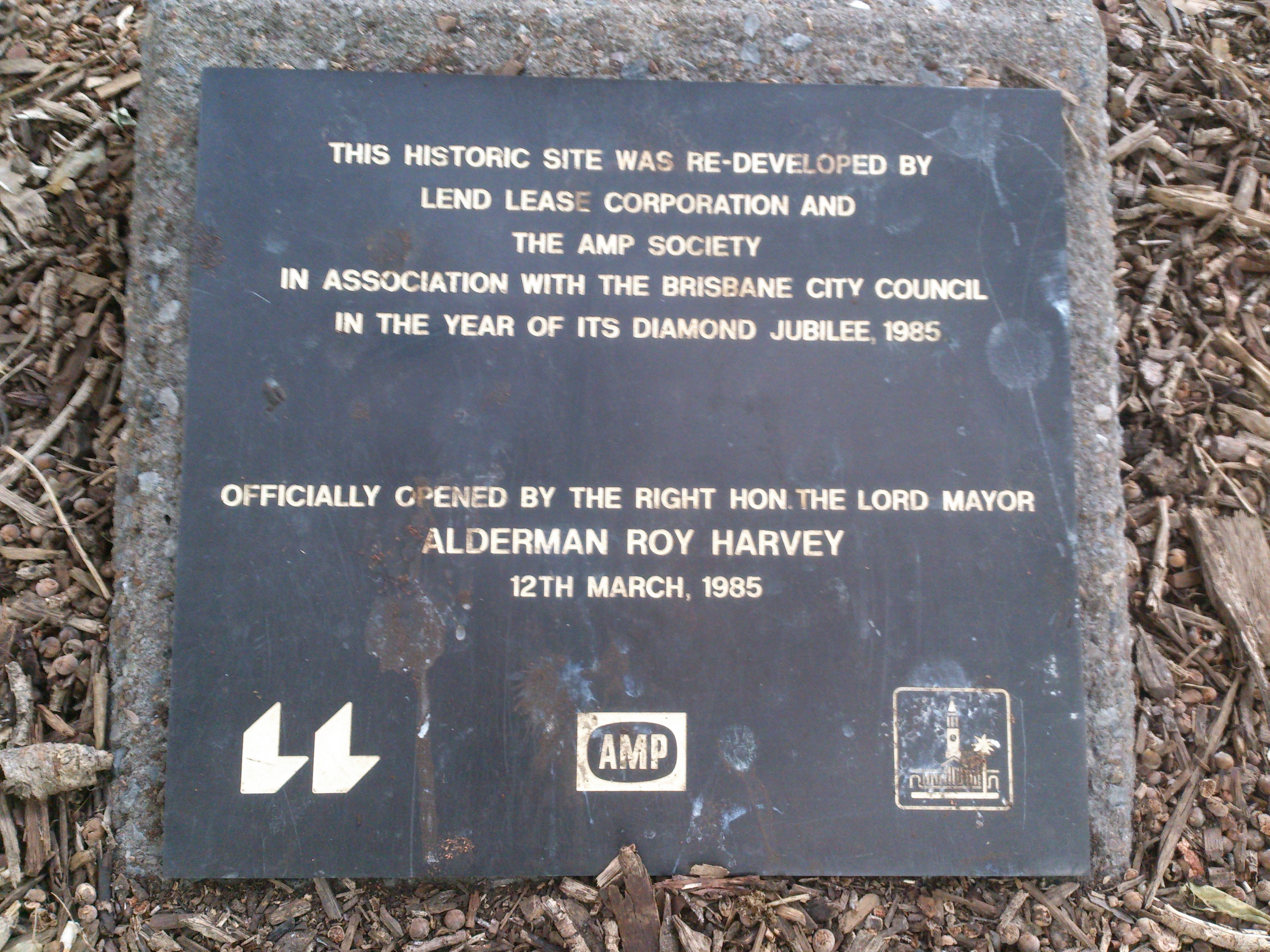
Opening Information

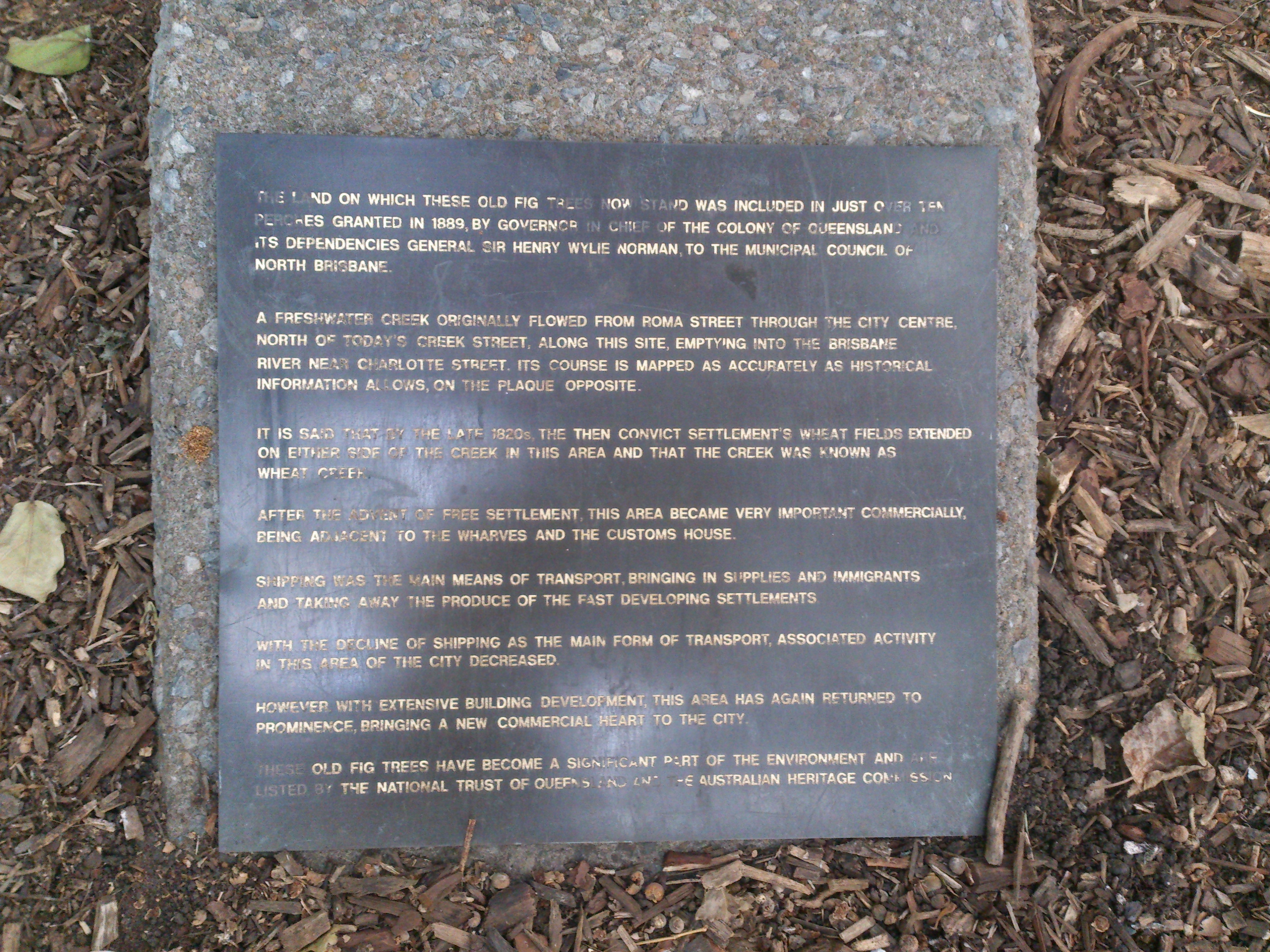
Creek History

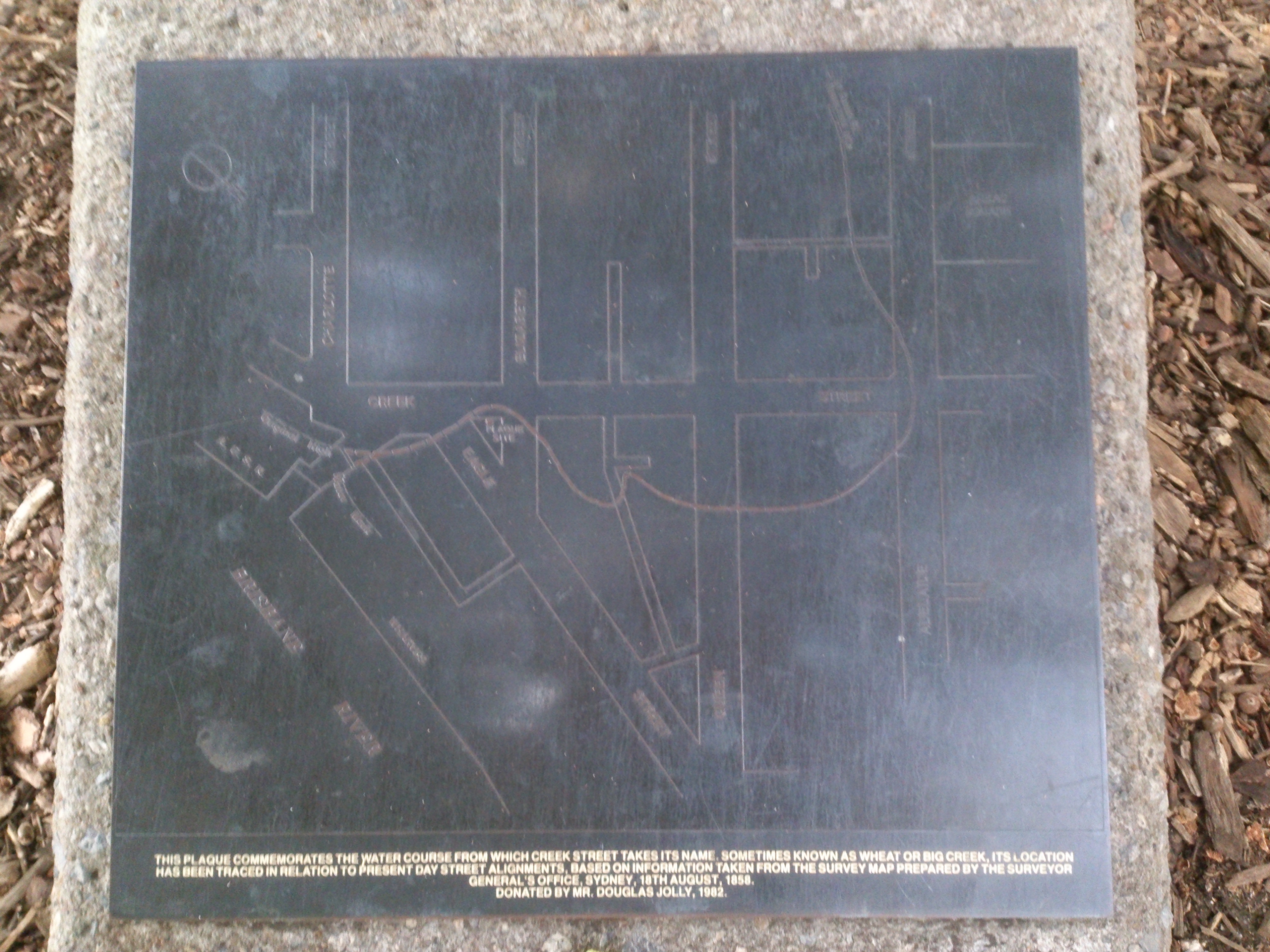
Map of Creek Path
