= Central Plaza Complex =

Office building complex in Brisbane

Central Plaza 1
- Central Plaza 1 from street
- Interactive map of the Central Plaza 1 area

General information
- Status: Completed
- Type: Commercial Office
- Coordinates: 27°28′02.58″S 153°01′45.62″E
- Completed: 1988

Height
- Roof: 174 m (571 ft)

Technical details
- Floor count: 44

The Central Plaza Complex consists of three commercial office buildings located in the Central Business District of Brisbane, Queensland, Australia. The complex was constructed in three phases with Central Plaza 1 completed first in 1988, followed by Central Plaza 2 in 1990 and Central Plaza 3 in 2008. Central Plaza 1 is the tallest of the three buildings, as well as the fifth tallest building in Brisbane.

== Central Plaza 1 ==
Central Plaza 1 was the first of three buildings constructed in the Central Plaza Complex and was completed in 1988. The building is located at 345 Queen Street in the Central Business District of Brisbane. It is the city's third tallest skyscraper, with a height of 174m and floor count of 44. The building was designed by renowned Japanese architect Kurokawa Kisho and had a planned height of 195m before being reduced to 174m.

Construction of the building was completed in 1988 and was subsequently bought by the Industry Superannuation Property Trust for $385 million.

At the time of its completion, Central Plaza 1 was the tallest building in Brisbane but has since been overtaken by Riparian Plaza (200m) completed in 2005, and Aurora Tower (207m) completed in 2006.

== Central Plaza 2 ==
Central Plaza 2
- Interactive map of the Central Plaza 2 area

General information
- Status: Completed
- Type: Commercial Office
- Completed: 1990

Height
- Roof: 110 m (360 ft)

Technical details
- Floor count: 30

Central Plaza 2 was the second of three buildings constructed in the Central Plaza Complex and was completed in 1990. The building is located at 66 Eagle Street in the Central Business District of Brisbane. It is the city's thirtieth tallest building with a height of 110m and floor count of 30, and has a combined floor area of 4,000 m^{2}.

== Central Plaza 3 ==
Central Plaza 3
- Interactive map of the Central Plaza 3 area

General information
- Status: Completed
- Type: Commercial Office
- Completed: 2008

Height
- Roof: 57 m (187 ft)

Technical details
- Floor count: 14

Central Plaza 3 was the third of three buildings constructed in the Central Plaza Complex and was completed in 2008. The building is located at 70 Eagle Street in the Central Business District of Brisbane. Central Plaza 3 has a height of 57m, floor count of 14, and a combined floor area of 1,500 m^{2}.

== See also ==
- List of tallest buildings in Brisbane
