= Brisbane Stock Exchange =

The Brisbane Stock Exchange was established in 1884 in Brisbane, Queensland, Australia. On 1 April 1987, it amalgamated with other stock exchanges in Australia to form the Australian Stock Exchange Limited (ASX) which because the Australian Securities Exchange in 2006.
