= Department of Primary Industries Building =

Heritage-listed building in Brisbane, Queensland

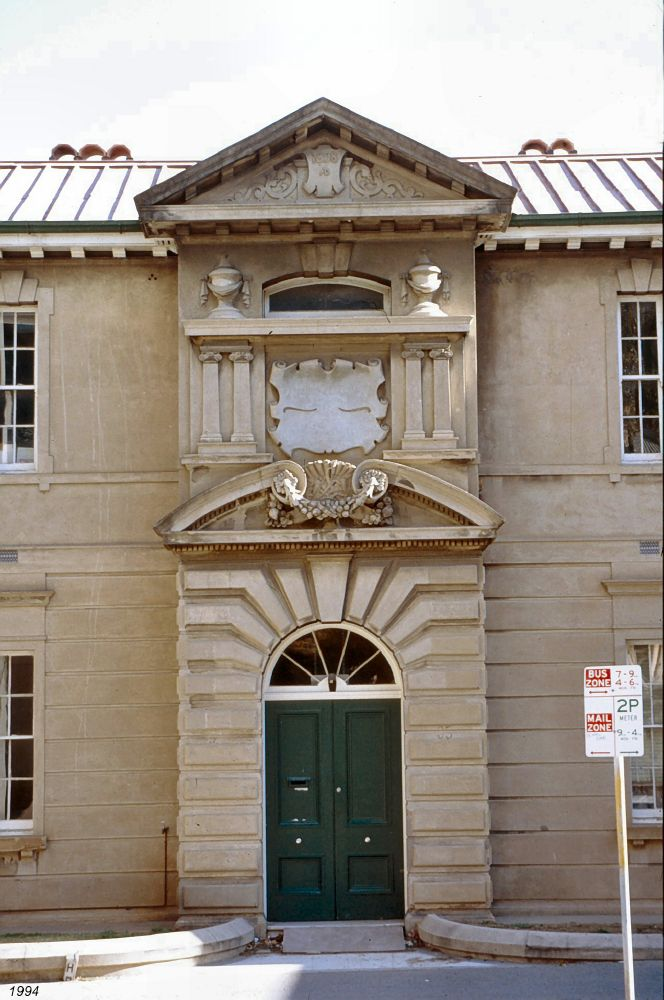
- Former Department of Primary Industries Building, 1994

- Location within Queensland Location within Australia
- 27.4736°S 153.0245°E
- Location: 99 William Street, Brisbane City, City of Brisbane, Queensland, Australia

History
- Design period: 1840s–1860s (mid-19th century)
- Built: 1865–1899

Site notes
- Architect: Charles Tiffin

Queensland Heritage Register
- Official name: Department of Primary Industries Building (former), Department of Agriculture, Department of Agriculture and Stock, Immigration Depot
- Type: state heritage (built)
- Designated: 4 July 1995
- Reference no.: 601093
- Significant period: 1865–1866, 1899 (fabric); 1865–1890, 1890–1989 (historical)
- Significant components: toilet block/earth closet/water closet, wall/s – retaining
- Builders: John Petrie

The Department of Primary Industries Building (now known as National Trust House) is a heritage-listed former public service building at 99 William Street, Brisbane City, City of Brisbane, Queensland, Australia. Prior to its adaptation for public service offices, it operated as the William Street Immigration Depot. It was added to the Queensland Heritage Register on 4 July 1995.

== History ==
The former Department of Primary Industries building, finished in unpainted render and painted brickwork, is built on a steeply sloping site with two storeys and basement fronting William Street and a lower three-storeyed wing at the rear fronting Queen's Wharf Road. with a hipped rib and pan galvanised iron roof.

The building was originally built as an Immigration Depot, and construction began in 1865 and completed in 1866.

The building was constructed on part of the former Commandant's Garden. The garden had been part of an attempt to establish some principles of behaviour at penal settlements throughout the Colony of New South Wales by the introduction of a Code of Regulations by Governor Ralph Darling which, amongst other things, entitled the Commandant to four acres of garden to be tended by up to three gardeners.

A wharf had been constructed c.1825 in front of the adjacent Commissariat and was originally known as King's Wharf, until 1837 when it became Queen's Wharf after the ascendancy of Queen Victoria. Queen's Wharf was the point of disembarkation of immigrants to the free colony from 1848 to 1897.

Successive colonial governments actively pursued a programme of immigration of free settlers after the Moreton Bay Penal Settlement had closed down. The first immigrants to come direct from overseas arrived on 15 December 1848 on the barque Artemisia. The first immigrants were housed temporarily in the Old Military Barracks which were located where the Treasury Building now stands. By the 1860s the barracks had deteriorated to such an extent that they were described in the local press as "wretched and dilapidated hovels... repugnant and harrowing and an abominable shed". The decision was made to erect a new facility, and the site was selected being a short distance from Queen's Wharf.

Construction began in 1865 and completed in 1866. Designed by the office of the first Queensland Colonial Architect, Charles Tiffin, the building was originally single-storeyed with basement to William Street with a three-storeyed wing at the rear. The rear wing contained three large separate wards, each 57 by 32 feet (17.4 by 9.8 m); one for single women at the William Street level, with married couples at the basement level and single men at the sub-basement level, which was also ground level at the rear. To each of these wards was attached a kitchen and bathroom, each on opposite sides. Earth closets were incorporated in a timber structure attached to the southwest of the building, and each ward had a separate entrance from the street. There were also residences for the matron and wardsman, and two rooms for the use of clerks and the Immigration Board in the William Street section. The sanitary arrangements were extensive, with a 2,500 imperial gallons (11,000 L; 3,000 US gal) tank supplying water to the whole of the building through lead pipes, with a condensing apparatus in operation at the river which pumped water to the building to supplement the supply of rain water. A luggage room was located on the nearby wharf, as immigrants were not allowed to take baggage into the depot.

The building had a hipped slate roof, unpainted brick walls, and footings of porphyry on weathered rock, and the rear section to Queen's Wharf had internal timber posts and beams supporting timber floor joists. The contractor was Mr John Petrie, and plumbers were Messrs Stewart and Watson. The original estimate was £3,800, but it was likely to have exceeded this estimate by several hundred pounds due to the construction of a substantial fence around the property, as well as a washing shed and luggage room.

In December 1887, the new Yungaba Immigration Depot at Kangaroo Point opened, and the William Street depot acted as a back-up facility until 1889. The ground floor was still being used in January 1890 as a ward for old men.

In 1890 the building was adapted to form the first offices for the newly established Department of Agriculture. The Department was created in 1887, one of a number of steps taken in the expansion of the role of government during the late 1880s and 1890s, and in 1904 became the Department of Agriculture and Stock, and in 1963 became the Department of Primary Industries. From 1890 onwards the old Immigration Depot was progressively altered and extended to accommodate offices and laboratories primarily for the Department of Agriculture and Stock, and subsequently for other government departments.

By December 1890 the Museum of Economic Botany was accommodated within the building. The following year the Minister of Agriculture was accommodated in the former Immigration Depot. The Minister appears to have been housed in the location previously occupied by the museum, at the rear of the building on the ground floor and the museum was relocated in 1893 to the basement (formerly single men's quarters). This area was partitioned, bunks were removed and a five foot high dado of vertically jointed pine was formed.

In 1897 the Stock Branch of the Colonial Secretary's Department was transferred to the Ministry of Agriculture. In 1898 tenders were called for extensions to the building, including two additional wings at either end and an extra storey to the William Street elevation. The extensions were designed by Thomas Pye, chief draftsman and assistant architect, and John Murdoch, draftsman and assistant architect, under Queensland Government Architect Alfred Brady. The form, scale and details of the alterations became the model for all subsequent additions. The tender by Caskie and Thompson was accepted. The extension was of load-bearing cavity brick set in lime-based mortar, with timber floors, and timber roof framing sheeted in galvanised iron rib and pan tiles. External walls were unpainted cement render, and internal walls plastered. The work included the installation of a central skylight in the rear section, and pressed metal ceilings and timber partitions were installed on the ground level of the rear section pre-1916. A toilet block containing earth closets with a nightman's stair was also constructed in 1899.

These extensions reflect the expansion of the Department at this time, particularly the growth in accommodation for entomologists and plant pathologists, as this area of plant science was to continue to expand in response to Queensland's growth in primary production.

In 1900 criticisms of plasterwork (specifically the external rendering over old brickwork to form quoins) led to a royal Commission of Inquiry. Remedial work was subsequently carried out in 1906. Prior to 1915, the southern doorway over the lightwell to William Street was enclosed and replaced with a sash window. In 1916 a new wing was constructed to the south (demolished 1994), consisting of foundation, basement, ground and first floor. This extension accommodated the Agricultural Chemical Laboratory, Entomology and Plant Pathology branches. It was built by day labour, and was intended to form the northwest wing of a new building, with the intention being to demolish the earlier sections of the building. Further extensions to the building were carried out in 1923, 1929, 1935 and 1936.

In 1922 a new staircase was added between the front and rear sections of the building, and the toilet block was reworked in 1924 to replace the original earth closets with water closets.

In 1940 a connection was made between the old photographic studio and the storeroom, and in 1944 the photographic studio suffered major damage by fire. The vertically jointed timber boarding to the rear verandahs was removed C.1951 and replaced with fibrous cement sheeting. Due to the confined nature of the area, a gradual drift from the site began in the 1950s, with the Department of Primary Industries vacating the building in 1989. In 1994 the post-1899 extensions were demolished to make way for a proposed new government office complex.

In the late 1990s, the building housed the offices for the Centenary of Federation. It currently houses the National Trust of Queensland and is known as National Trust House; it also houses the Office of the Queensland Government Architect and the Architectural Practice Academy.

== Description ==
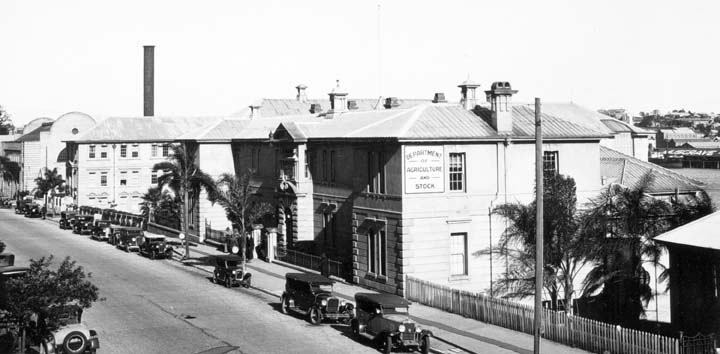
Department of Primary Industries Building, 1936

The former Department of Primary Industries Building, an unpainted rendered and painted brickwork structure, consists of a two-storeyed with basement section fronting William Street with a lower three-storeyed wing at the rear fronting Queen's Wharf Road. The building, located adjacent to the former Commissariat Store, and across the road from the former Queensland Government Printing Office and adjacent former Land Administration Building), is built on a steeply sloping site, and has a hipped rib and pan galvanised iron roof.

The symmetrical William Street section has a central entrance with a projecting wing at either end. The ground floor has coursed render with quoining, the first floor has an expressed band at window sill height and the eaves are jettied.

The entrance consists of a two-storeyed gabled element which projects from the face of the building, and is composed of an arched doorway to the ground floor with unpainted rendered classical detailing above and to the first floor. The detailing includes coursed render to the ground floor expressing voussoirs, above which is located an open-crown pediment with relief mouldings which are described in the Brisbane Sculpture Guide (Judith McKay 1988) as The festoon of Queensland agricultural produce—including wheat, strawberries, macadamia nuts, bananas and pumpkins— (which) is given due status by the addition of classical acanthus leaves. Above this are paired columns either side of a shield, which originally housed the words "DEPARTMENT OF AGRICULTURE", which support an entablature with an urn at either end and a low arched window with expressed keystone to the first floor in the centre. The pediment above has a central shield with the date 1898 AD. The doorway has double panelled timber doors, with an arched fanlight with radiating mullions.

The William Street facade has paired tall, narrow, multi-paned timber sash windows, with the end facades having single sashes. The ground floor windows are surrounded by unpainted rendered mouldings with expressed sills and cornices above, and the first floor windows have similar details but with keystone-type heads. The northern end facade has a central chimney, with curved details at first floor height, which is surmounted by a large cornice with double arched flue covers. The southern end facade, the point of connection to the recently demolished post-1899 extensions, has been rendered to suggest floor levels and the position of the original chimney.

The William Street facade also has two lightwells to the basement, located either side of the central entry abutting the end wings, which consist of a curved porphyry retaining wall with sandstone capping and wrought iron balustrading. The lightwells are bridged by a concrete walkway where they abut the end wings, accessing a single panelled timber door with fanlight, and featuring an iron gate with the letters DA intertwined. The southern door, however, has been enclosed and replaced with a sash window, and a later sash window has been introduced to the first floor flanking wall of the southern wing. A retaining wall with sandstone capping, end pillar and wrought iron balustrade extends from the building along the William Street frontage to the south.

The rear of the William Street section has verandahs to all three floors either side of the central rear wing and abutting the end wings. Originally enclosed with vertically jointed boarding covering verandah stairs with open arched sections either end, the verandahs have all since been enclosed with fibrous cement sheeting and a variety of windows.

The rear wing is a three-storeyed painted masonry structure on a porphyry base, one level lower than the William Street section, with a crucifix plan and a number of additions which include a three-storeyed toilet block on the northwest, a two-storeyed enclosure on the southeast, and various stairs and single-storeyed sheds around the base. Floor levels are expressed with relief banding, windows are mostly multi-paned sashes, and timber and iron window hoods are located on most windows on the southwest.

The toilet block has arched sash windows to the base, with high level hopper windows to the floors above. This block is linked to the main structure via cantilevered walkways on the ground and basement levels, which consist of curved iron brackets supporting a timber walkway with iron balustrade. The two-storeyed enclosure on the southeast has a skillion roof, with fixed glazing above chamferboard to the basement level and brick piers. A steel fire stair is located at the rear of the building.

Internally, the William Street section has a central entry vestibule, with rooms accessed via the rear verandah or through adjoining doorways. A concrete stair with an iron balustrade and timber handrail is located centrally in the linking section to the rear wing, and is accessed through an arch which has been enclosed to form a doorway . Timber staircases were originally located on the rear verandahs, but only one flight remains linking the basement and ground floor on the southern side. This staircase has chamfered newel posts with turned capitals, and a timber batten balustrade which has been mostly sheeted over with hardboard. Some original timber verandah balustrading and chamfered posts are visible, again with the majority being sheeted over. Doors are panelled timber with fanlights, walls are plastered, and ceilings are boarded, some of which have been sheeted over with hardboard. Evidence of the former corridor linking the now demolished post-1899 extensions is visible in the first floor at the southern end, with timber and glass partitions dividing the space. The basement level has exposed porphyry walls to the lightwell, and a later lean-to bathroom is located on the south corner accessed via the verandah. Timber fireplace surrounds have been removed, but evidence of their form survives.

Internally, the rear wing consists of a large former immigration ward flanked by former kitchen and bathroom to each floor, with timber post and beam internal construction. The ground floor level has been partitioned with a central corridor leading to a large room at the rear, and has a central skylight which consists of glazed roofing sections which light glazed ceiling panels to the hall and adjacent side rooms. Ceilings throughout this section have pressed metal sheeting of various designs. The basement level has a lower floor level than the William Street section and boarded timber ceilings. The sub-basement level is similar, but with a number of partitioned rooms along either side. The toilet block has concrete floors, plastered walls and timber partition cubicles.

== Heritage listing ==
Department of Primary Industries Building (former) was listed on the Queensland Heritage Register on 4 July 1995 having satisfied the following criteria.

The place is important in demonstrating the evolution or pattern of Queensland's history.

The former Department of Primary Industries building, originally built as an immigration depot in 1865–66 and the interior of which substantially retains its originally planning, is representative of early Queensland Colonial Government infrastructure, and the importance that was placed on immigration and its contribution to the colony's future.

The place demonstrates rare, uncommon or endangered aspects of Queensland's cultural heritage.

Together with the adjacent former Commissariat Store, the building is a rare surviving riverside structure once associated with Queen's Wharf, an important point of transport and commerce from the time of the establishment of the Penal Settlement, and reflects the pattern of development of the surrounding government precinct.

The place is important because of its aesthetic significance.

The building makes a significant aesthetic contribution, through form, scale, and materials, to the Brisbane townscape, and is an important member of a group of early government buildings including the former Commissariat Store, former Government Printing Office and former Land Administration building.

The place has a special association with the life or work of a particular person, group or organisation of importance in Queensland's history.

The building is also illustrative of the growth of the Department of Agriculture; and the importance of its contribution to the growth and development of the Queensland economy.
