= William Street, Brisbane =

Street in Brisbane, Queensland

William Street Queensland
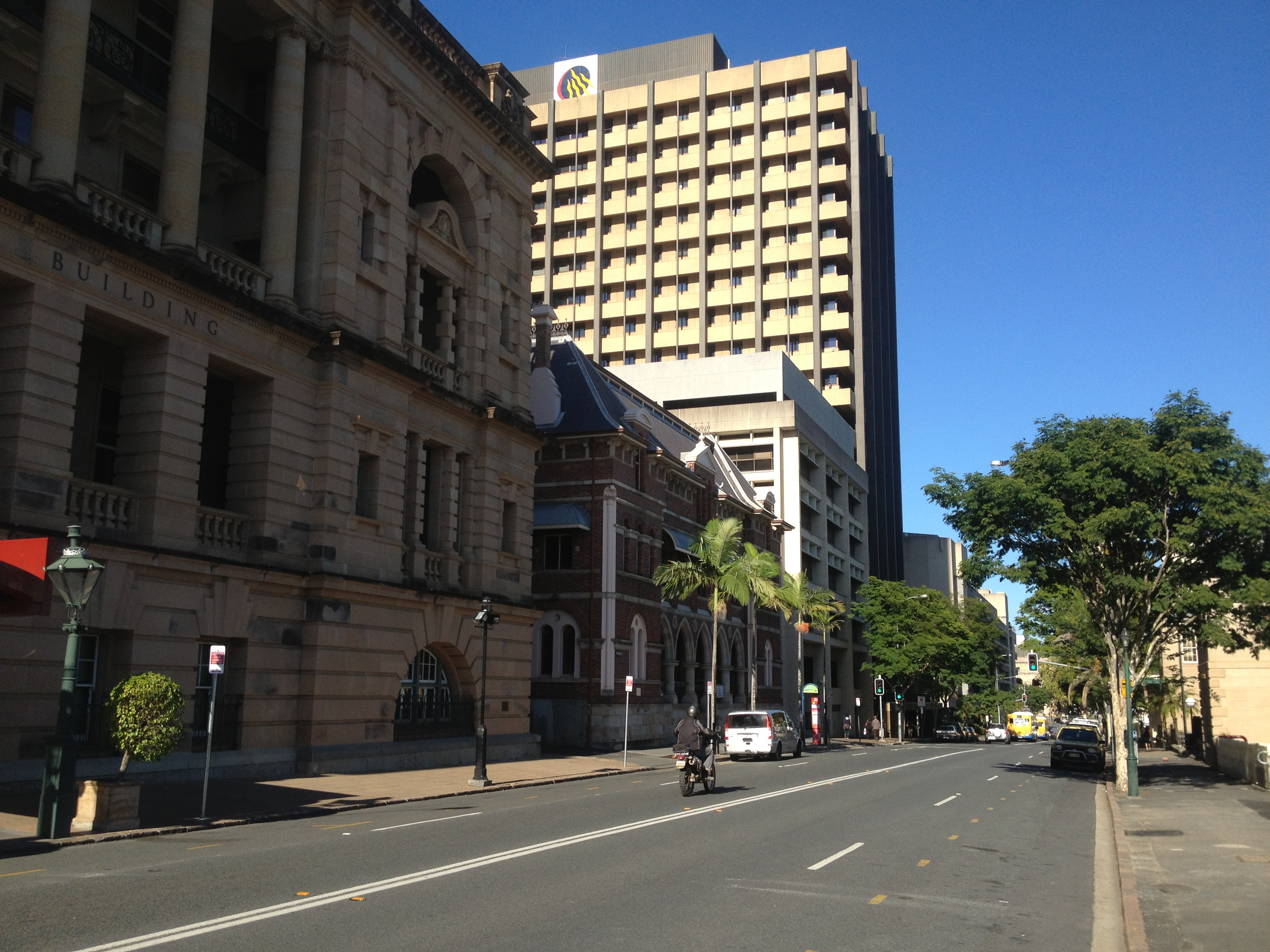
- William Street, looking towards Parliament House.
- Coordinates: 27.473119°S 153.022006°E

General information
- Type: Street
- Location: Brisbane

William Street is a short, relatively quiet road on the western side of the Brisbane central business district. The street is historically significant to the city's early development as a penal colony. The first convict buildings were built along William Street in 1825.

== Geography ==
The street's northern end starts at the intersection of Queen Street and the Victoria Bridge.

Parallel to this road on the western side is the Riverside Expressway and to the east is George Street.

Major intersections with William Street are (from north-west to south-east):

- Queen Street / Victoria Bridge, Brisbane
- Elizabeth Street
- Margaret Street
- Alice Street

== History ==
In 1851, the United Evangelical Church opened on William Street; it was used by many denominations.

The Queensland Museum was once situated in William Street in the building now known as the Old State Library.

== Heritage listings ==
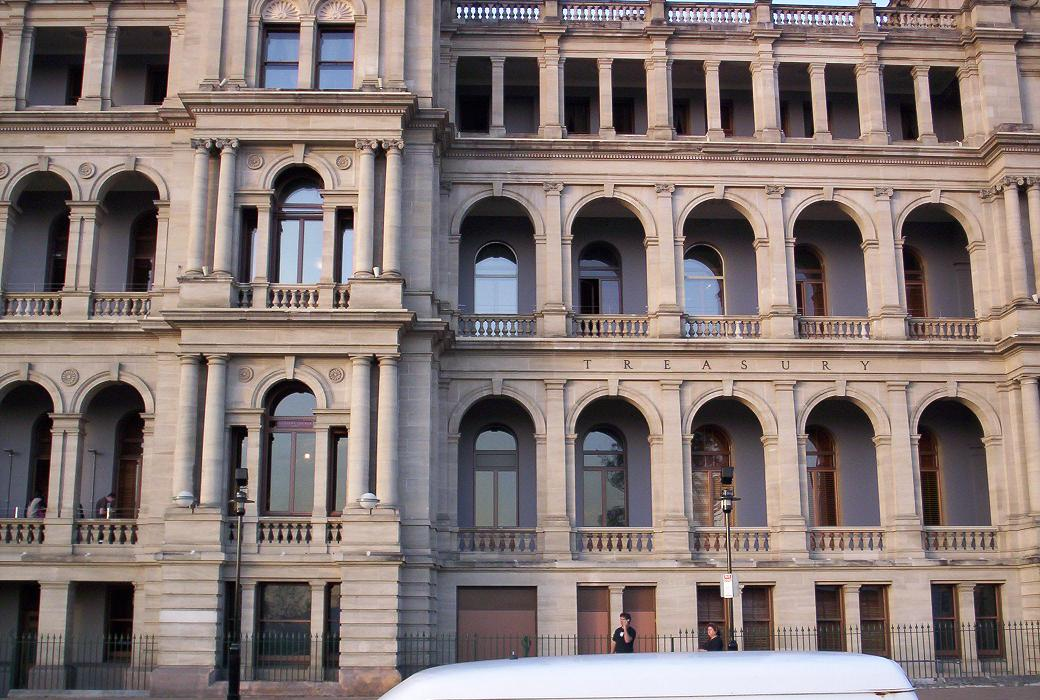
William Street face of the former Treasury Building.

William Street has a number of heritage-listed sites, including:

- William Street: William Street retaining wall
- 99 William Street: the former Department of Primary Industries Building
- 110 George Street and 84 William Street: the former Queensland Government Printing Office
- 115–127 William Street: the former Commissariat Store
- 159 William Street: Old State Library
- Sections of Albert St, George St, William St, North Quay, Queen's Wharf Rd: Early Streets of Brisbane
- 144 George Street: Queens Gardens (on the corner of William Street)

== Notable buildings ==
One of the most notable buildings on William Street is the Treasury Building which used to house the Conrad Treasury Casino. This building was built in three stages, with the William Street section being constructed first.

The Queens Gardens are nearby with an underground carpark that exits on to William Street. The park is found on the corner of William and Elizabeth Street. On the river side of the street is the Old State Library Building.

The gardens mark the end of the North Quay and the beginning of the government precinct. Further south is the Lands Administration Building and 1 William Street, Brisbane which contains the majority of Queensland Government departments. Also in the area is the Commissariat Store which was built by convicts in 1829, making it one of Brisbane's oldest surviving buildings.

At the southern end of William Street is Alice Street and the Parliament House building.

== Queen's Wharf development ==
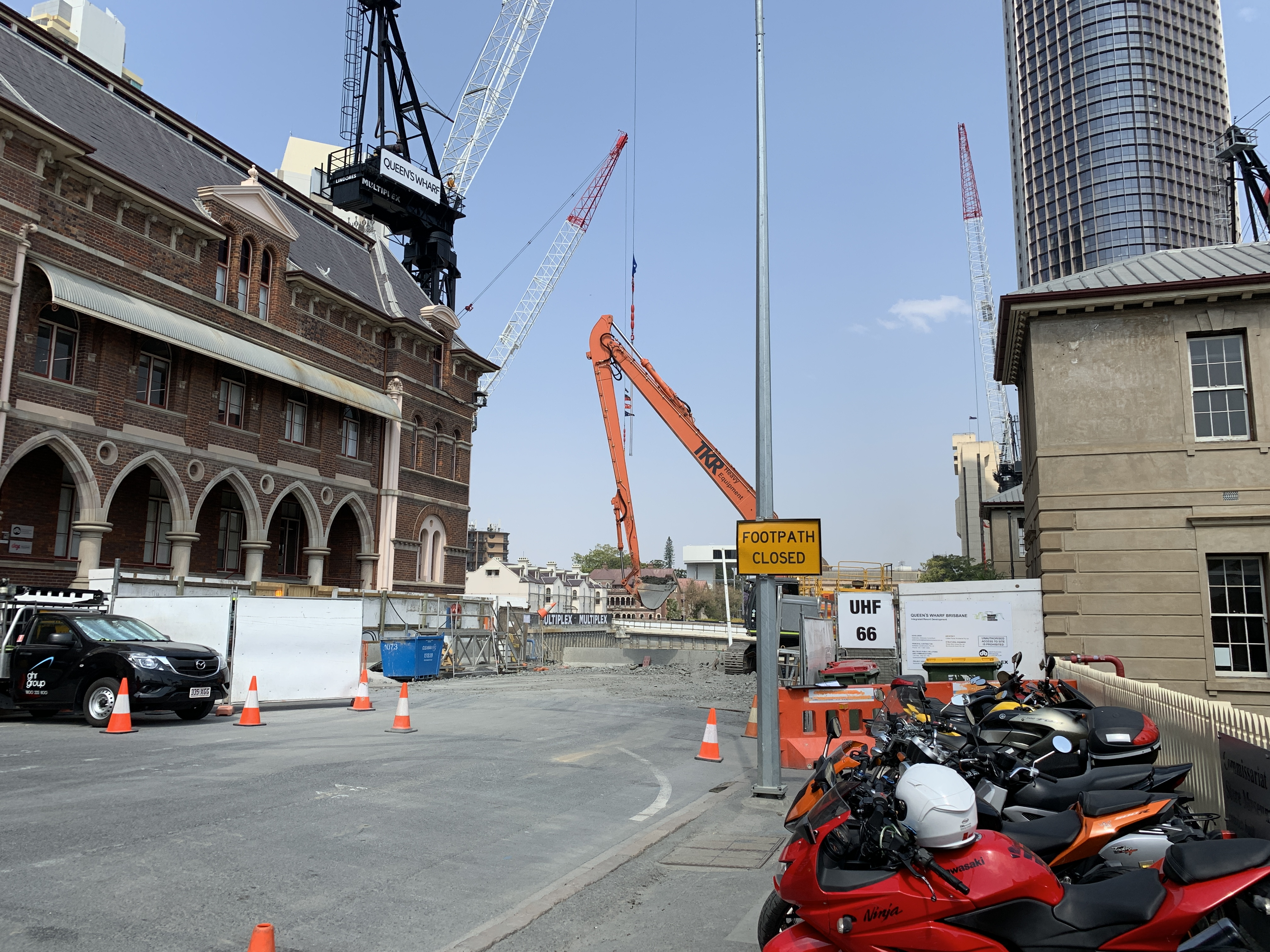
Queens Wharf construction site in William Street, October 2019

The Queen's Wharf development of an entertainment precinct will be bounded by Queen Street, George Street, Alice Street and the Brisbane River. All of William Street will become part of the precinct.

== See also ==
- Road transport in Brisbane
