= Elizabeth Street, Brisbane =

Street in Brisbane, Queensland

Elizabeth Street Queensland
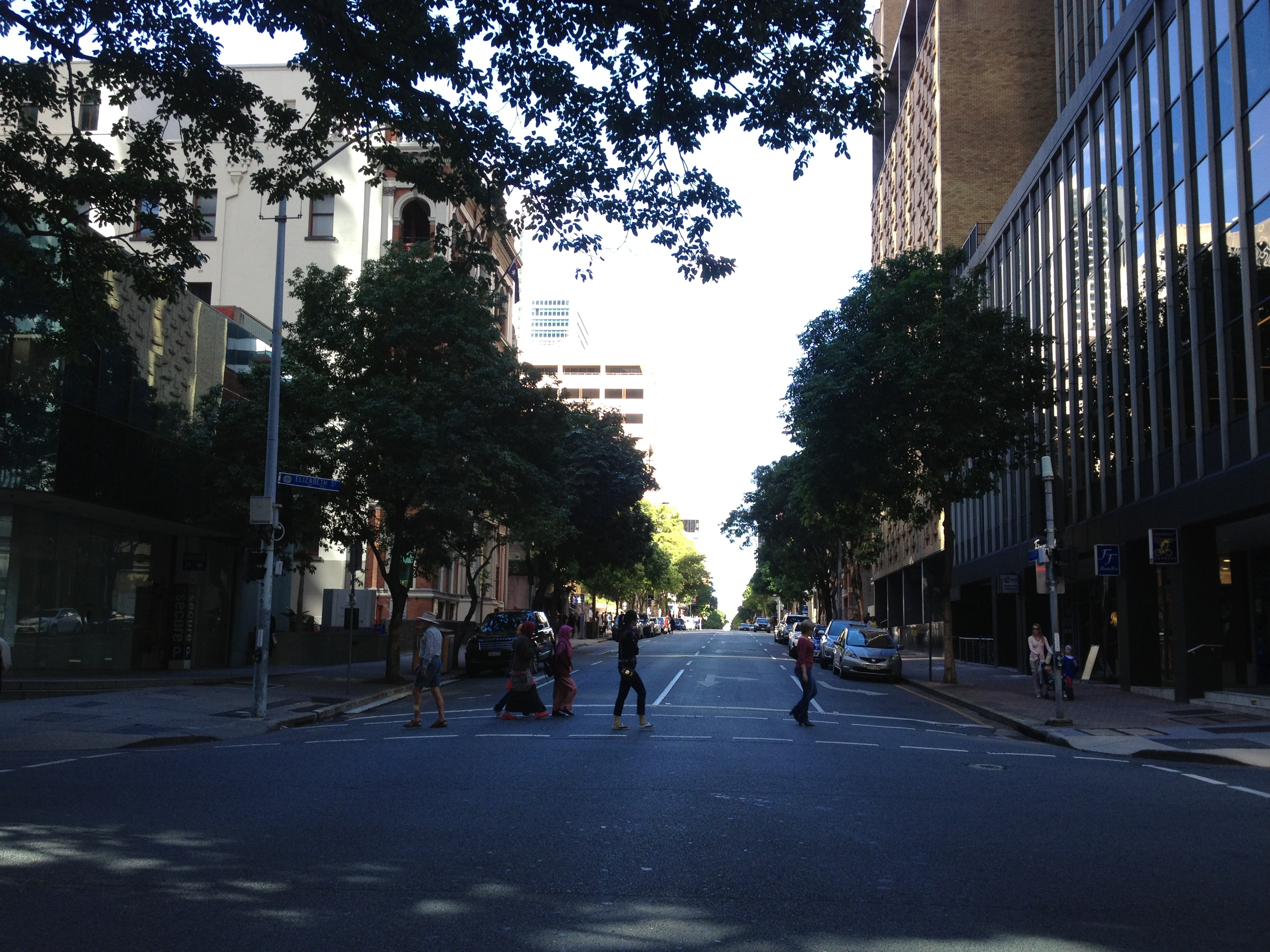
- Elizabeth Street from Creek Street intersection.
- Coordinates: 27.4703°S 153.026°E

General information
- Type: Street
- Location: Brisbane

Elizabeth Street is a major street in the central business district of Brisbane, Queensland, Australia. The street was one of the earliest in Brisbane, having been constructed around the same time as the establishment of the Moreton Bay penal settlement. Today, most of the street is fronted by low-level retail outlets, with an increase in mixed-use skyscrapers being recently constructed.

== Geography ==
Major shopping arcades on Elizabeth Street include The Myer Centre, Marcarthur Central and the Elizabeth Arcade. The Brisbane Hilton hotel has it main entrance on Elizabeth Street. The offices at Central Plaza Two have their entrance at the easterly end or downtown part of the street.

There is good pedestrian access around the street, such as pathways near the General Post Office and access to the Queen Street bus station via the Myer Centre. The street runs parallel to and south of the city's central mall in Queen Street. To ease congestion in the Brisbane central business district traffic direction is one-way from west to east.

At the top of the street nearest the Brisbane River is William Street and exit ramps from the Riverside Expressway. Between this intersection and George Street is the Queens Gardens, a small open park. Adjacent to this is the Treasury Building and the Conrad Treasury Casino, which is open 24 hours a day.

Elizabeth Street was one of various Brisbane locations used in the filming of the 2015 motion picture San Andreas. The street was used to represent downtown San Francisco after a major earthquake struck that city, with over 300 extras participating in the shooting of the scene.

== History ==
Brisbane's first theatre, the Theatre Royal was at 80 Elizabeth Street. It was first built in 1865, was remodelled on a number of occasions and was demolished in 1987 to make way for the Myer Centre.

Since the closure of the Victoria Bridge to general traffic in 2021, traffic volumes on Elizabeth Street declined.

== Heritage listings ==
Elizabeth Street has a number of heritage-listed sites, including:

- 171 Elizabeth Street: Heckelmanns Building
- 179 Elizabeth Street: Tara House (Irish Club)
- 249 Elizabeth Street: Old St Stephens Church
- 259–269 Elizabeth Street: St Stephens Catholic Cathedral
- 283 Elizabeth Street: Telecommunications House
- Sections of Albert St, George St, William St, North Quay, Queen's Wharf Rd: Early Streets of Brisbane (includes land now on Elizabeth Street)
- 144 George Street: Queens Gardens (on the corner of Elizabeth Street)
- 167 Albert Street: Perry House (on the corner of Elizabeth Street)
- 171 George Street: Family Services Building (on the corner of Elizabeth Street)
- 179–191 George Street: Hunters Buildings (Treasury Chambers, St Francis House & Symons Building), a L-shaped building which fronts both George and Elizabeth Streets

== Major intersections ==
- Riverside Expressway
- William Street
- George Street
- Albert Street
- Edward Street
- Creek Street
- Eagle Street

== See also ==
- Adelaide Street
- Ann Street
- Charlotte Street
- Mary Street
- Margaret Street
