= Queens Gardens, Brisbane =

Heritage listed park in Brisbane, Queensland

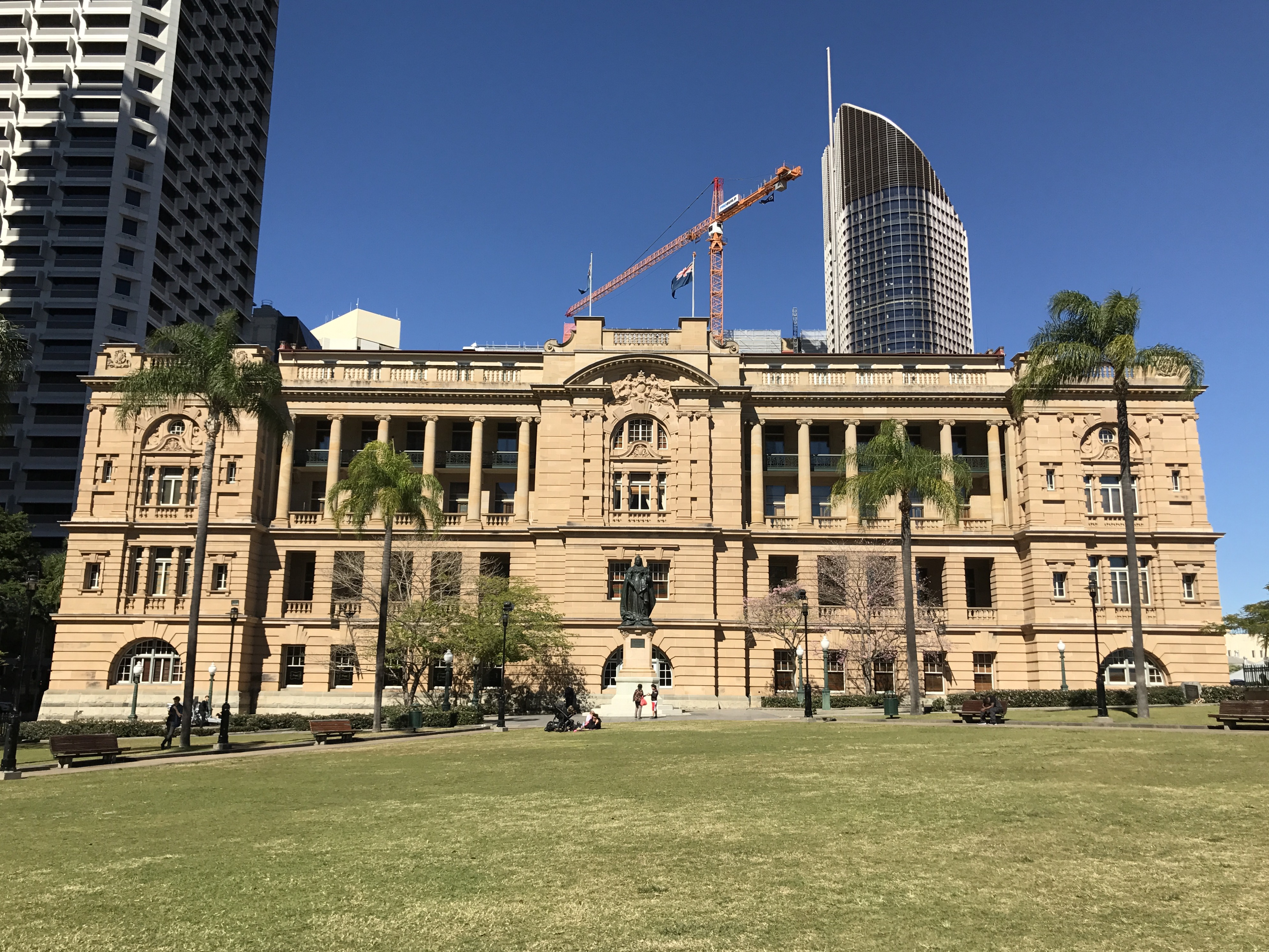
- Queens Gardens, looking to the statue of Queen Victoria and the former Land Administration Building (now Heritage Hotel), 2017

- Location within Queensland
- 27.4723°S 153.0242°E
- Location: 144 George Street, Brisbane CBD, City of Brisbane, Queensland, Australia

History
- Design period: 1900–1914 (early 20th century)
- Built: c. 1905–1990s

Queensland Heritage Register
- Official name: Queens Gardens, Executive Gardens, St Johns Church Reserve
- Type: state heritage (built, landscape, archaeological)
- Designated: 21 October 1992
- Reference no.: 600112
- Significant period: 1820s–1830s, 1848–1899, 1901–1962, (historical)
- Significant components: lake / pond / waterway, post/s – lamp, tree groups – avenue of, lawn/s, statue, seating, memorial – rock/stone/boulder, garden – bed/s, pathway/walkway, trees/plantings, guns/weaponry/armament

Queens Gardens is a heritage-listed park located on a city block between George Street, Elizabeth Street and William Street in the Brisbane CBD, City of Brisbane, Queensland, Australia. It was built from c. 1905 to 1990s. It is also known as Executive Gardens and St Johns Church Reserve. It was added to the Queensland Heritage Register on 21 October 1992.

Queens Gardens are adjacent to the former Land Administration Building (now the Heritage Hotel of the Treasury Casino). On the opposite side of William Street is the Old State Library Building and on the opposite side of Elizabeth Street is the former Treasury Building (now the Treasury Casino).

== History ==
As an early penal colony the site was originally home to a cottage, lumber yard, engineer's store and workshops.

Queens Gardens was established in several stages between 1905 and 1962, on a site which has been associated both with the earliest phase of the penal settlement at Moreton Bay, and with the establishment of the Church of England in Queensland.

During the convict era the engineer's weatherboard cottage stood on part of the site, at the corner of William and Elizabeth Streets. It appears to have been both the first house and the first sawn timber building to be erected in Brisbane Town.

Occupying most of the remainder of the site was a lumber yard, erected c.1825, which contained the engineer's stores and workshops. By 1838 the lumber yard had been moved, and the cottage had been converted into offices. The section of the present park along George Street was part of the chaplain's garden from 1840 at least.

In 1848 the site was acquired by the Church of England. A parsonage was constructed at the corner of William and Elizabeth Streets in 1850–1851, and St John's Church was erected on the site, further along William Street, in 1850–1854. In 1868 it was extended. A detached bell tower was erected in 1877, and in 1879–1880 a building which served as church school, synod hall, library and committee rooms was built in the eastern corner of the site.

In the 1880s the Church proclaimed the square a future cathedral site, and a new Church Institute and Synod Hall was erected in the northern corner of the square in 1897.

Following church protests at the 1899 announcement of plans to erect a new lands and survey building adjacent to the pro-cathedral, the government offered to purchase the church square, and acquired it the same year.

In 1901 the Church Institute building was occupied by the Police Department and later served as offices for the Criminal Investigation Branch.

In 1904 the pro-cathedral, belltower, church school and parsonage were demolished and a 0.25 hectares (0.62 acres), 30-metre (98 ft) wide strip between William and George Streets, adjacent to the new Executive Building, was proclaimed as the Executive Gardens.

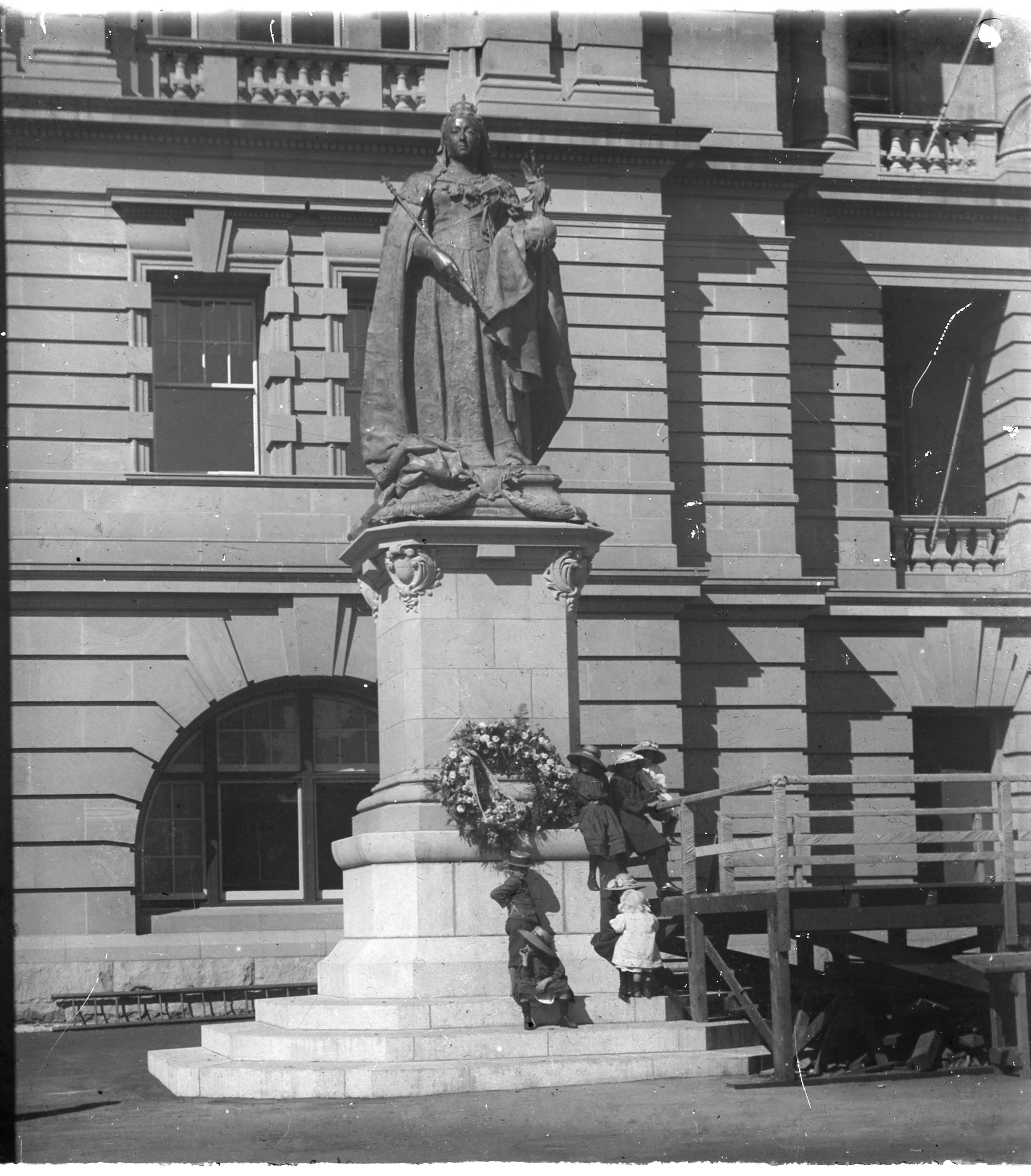
Historic photo of the statue of Queen Victoria

A bronze statue of Queen Victoria, a replica by English sculptor Thomas Brock of the original in Portsmouth, was erected in mid-1906. The purchase was arranged by local artist Godfrey Rivers, and was funded by public subscription and subsidies from state and local government. The pedestal was designed by the Public Works Department and crafted by local stonemason William Kitchen, at a cost of £567.

The statue was an expression of Queensland's loyalty to the British Empire. On Empire Day veterans from the Crimean, Sudan and South African wars gathered in what became known as the Queens Gardens, which became also an assembly point for state occasions such as funeral or celebratory processions. The monument remains the only statue of Queen Victoria in Brisbane.

In late 1906 the reserve was extended to an area of 0.37 hectares (0.91 acres), with the inclusion of the site of the former parsonage.

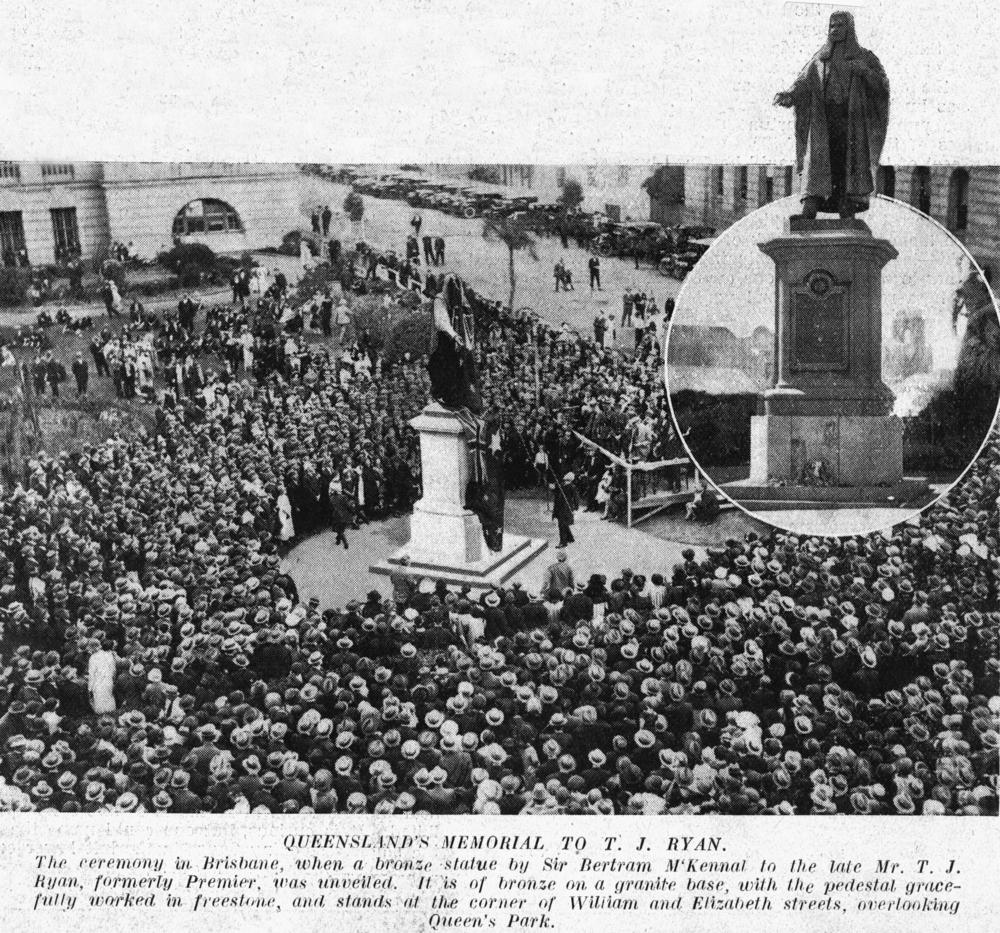
Unveiling the statue of TJ Ryan, 1925

In 1917 a Krupp 77mm field gun, captured from the German army in France in 1915 during World War I, was placed in the gardens. It was a gift from King George V and presented to Queensland by Lord Kitchener as a Trophy of British Valour on 18 August 1917, at the request of Thomas Joseph Ryan, lawyer, anti-conscriptionist and Queensland Labor Premier 1915–1919.

A bronze statue of TJ Ryan, designed by Australian sculptor Bertram MacKennal and erected by public subscription, was unveiled in the gardens in 1925. The sandstone base was provided by the Brisbane City Council.

In 1962 the CIB building at the northern corner of the site was demolished and the park was extended to occupy the entire square, with a total area of 0.48 hectares (1.2 acres). A new layout for the gardens was prepared as a joint state and local government scheme in preparation for the visit of Queen Elizabeth II to Brisbane in March 1963. Brisbane City Council landscape architect, horticulturalist and author, Harry Oakman, was responsible for the design and landscaping, and architectural detailing was undertaken by Department of Works architect Graham De Gruchy.

In 1990 the Queensland Service Women's Association erected a Monument of Memories in the park, honouring the 70,000 service women.

== Description ==
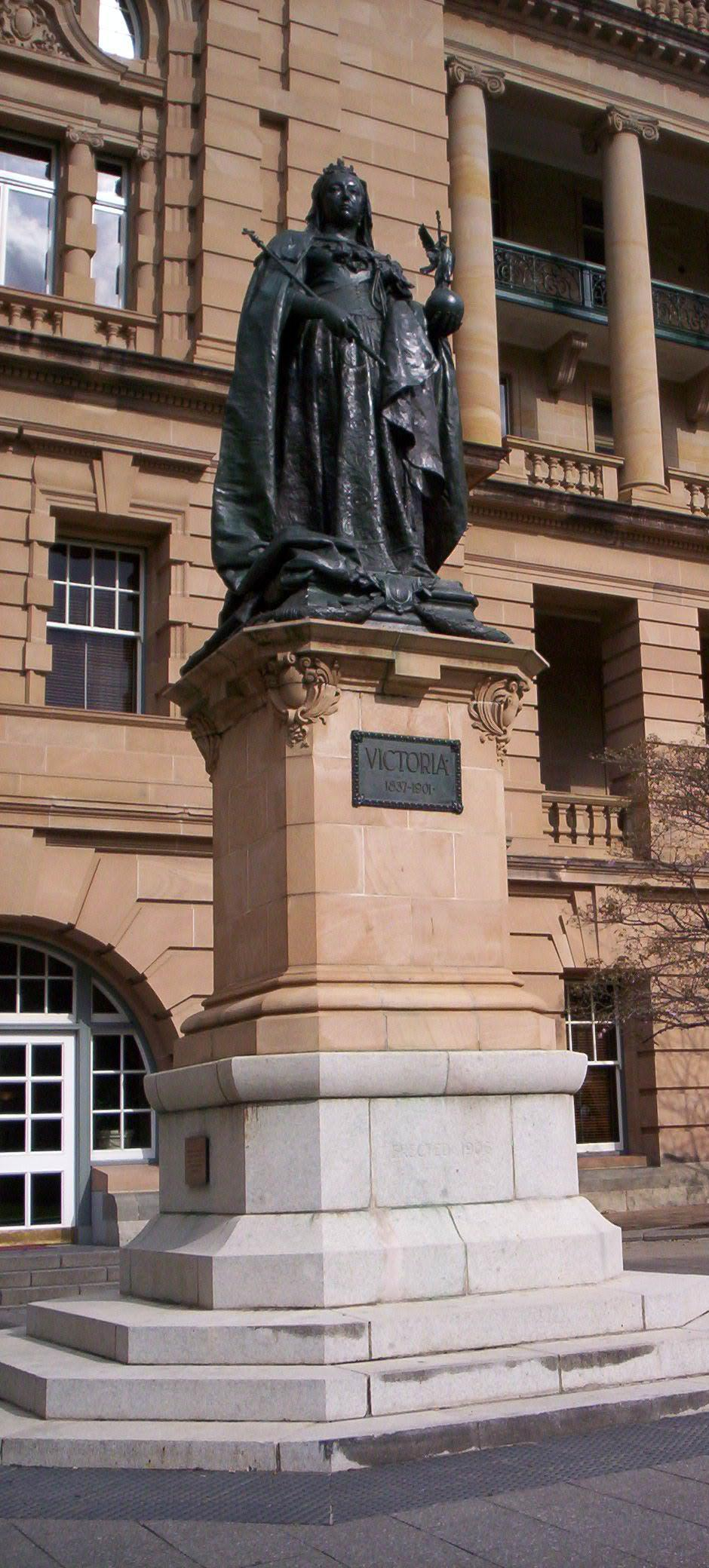
Statue of Queen Victoria, 2005

Queens Gardens is a public park, square in plan, that is bounded by William, Elizabeth and George Streets on the southwestern, northwestern and northeastern sides and by the Lands Administration Building (now Heritage Hotel) on the southeastern edge. Located around the perimeter of the Gardens are a number of important government buildings including the Lands Administration Building, the Treasury Building (now the Treasury Casino), the Old State Library and the Family Services Building.

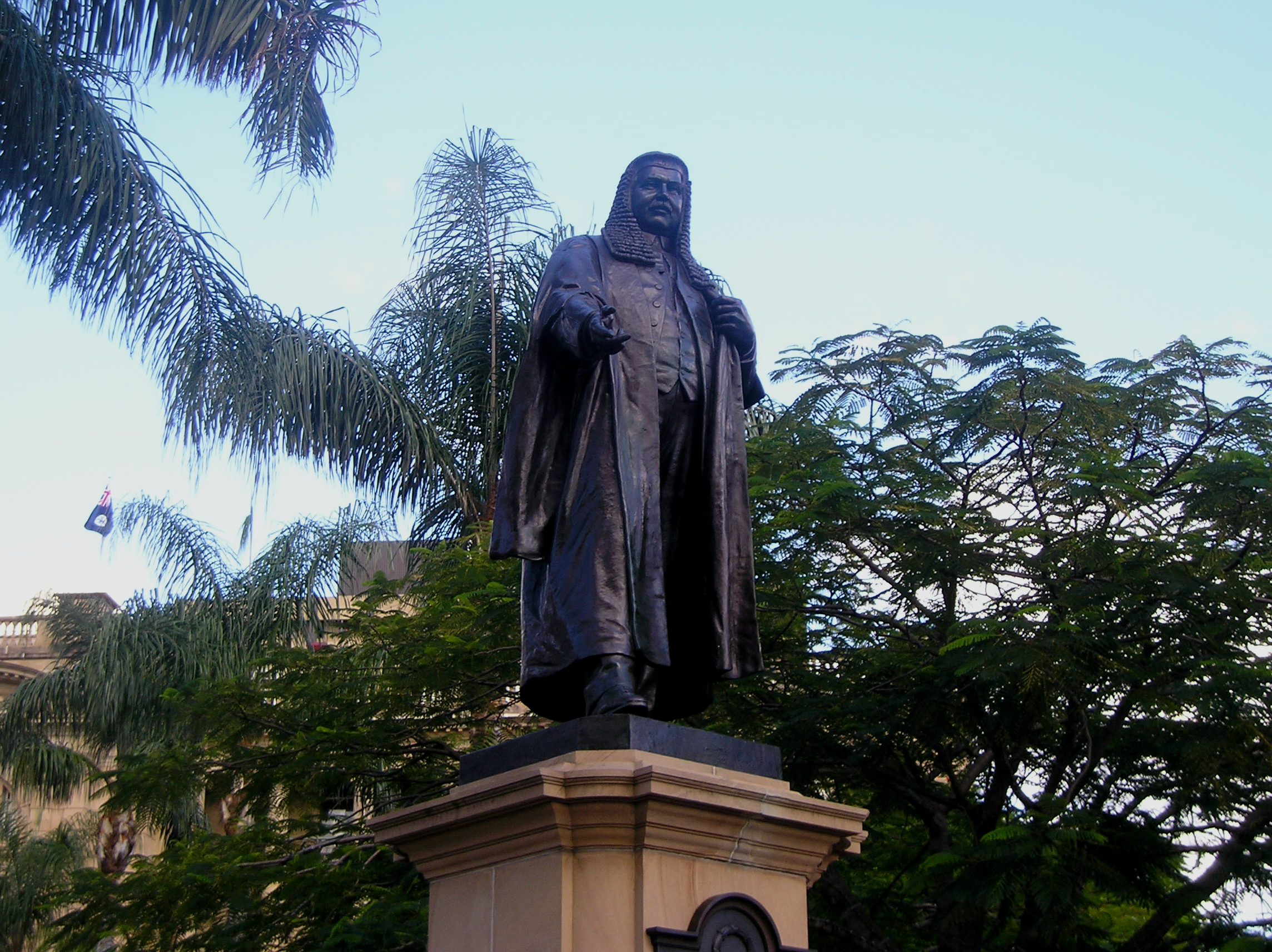
TJ Ryan statue, 2005

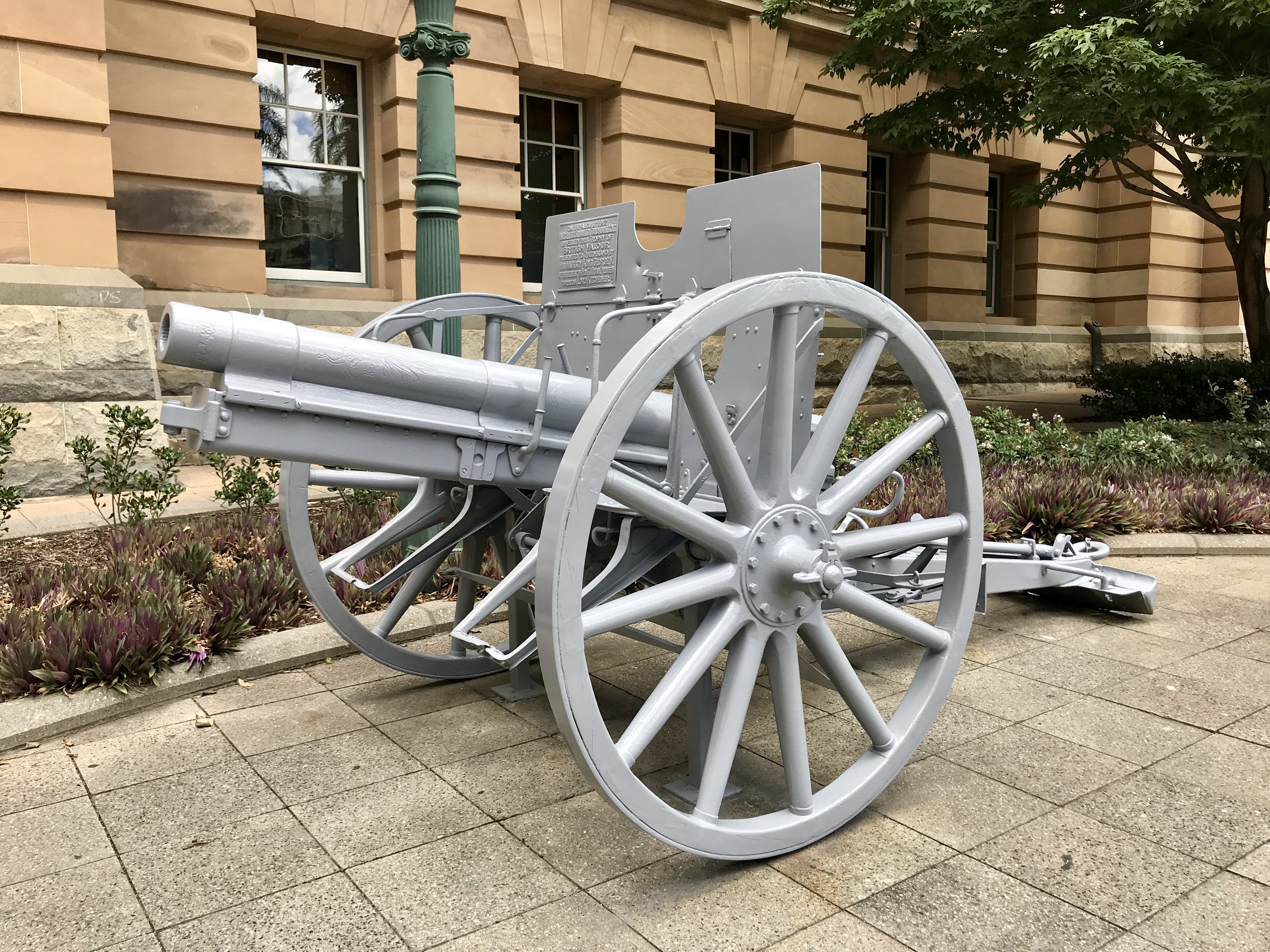
Trophy of British Valour, 2018

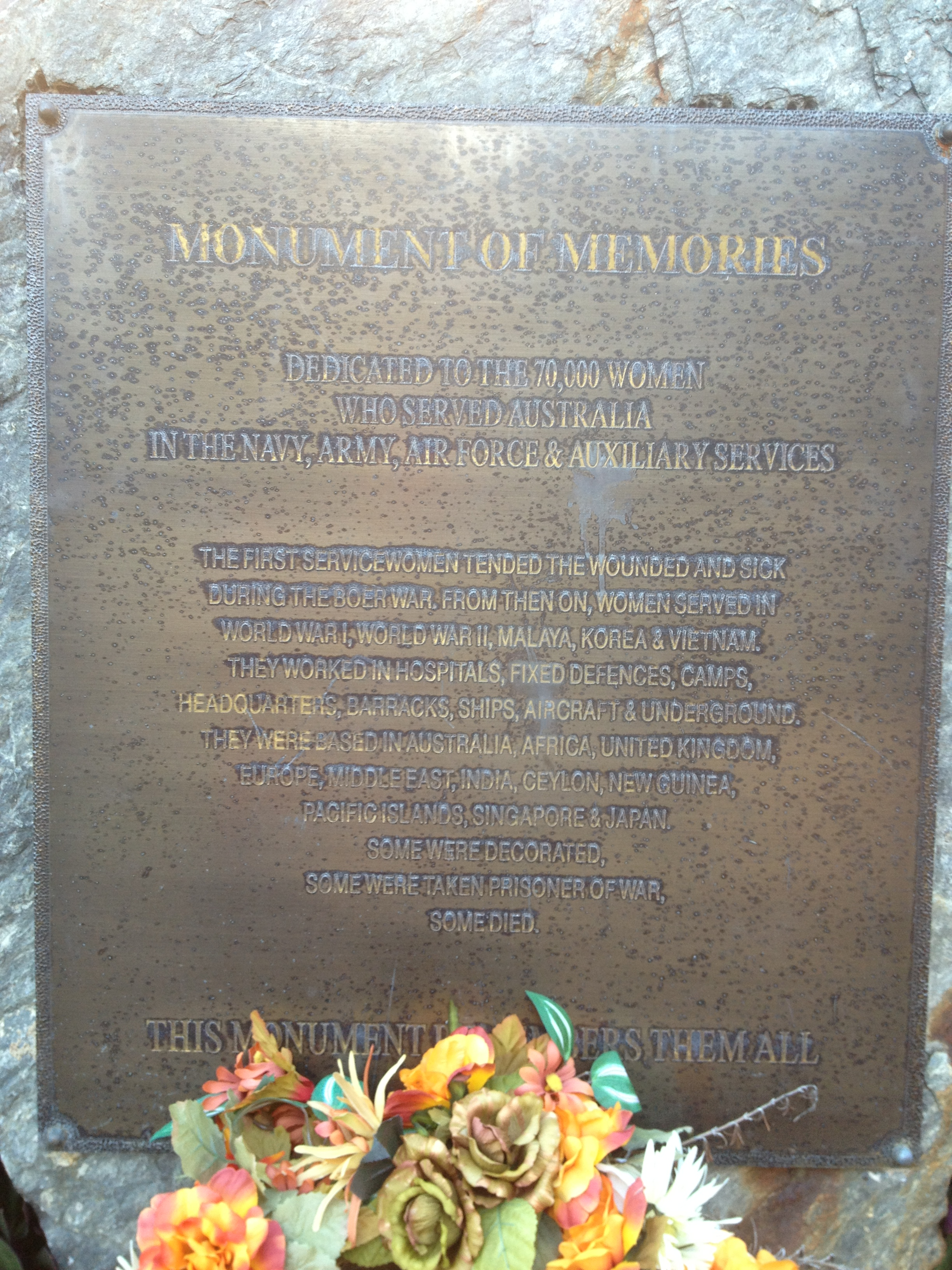
Monument of Memories, dedicated to Australia's service women, 2013

The main elements of the design are: an asphalt area in front of the Lands Administration Building which connects George and William Streets; a diagonal path leading from the northern corner to the centre of the asphalt area; and a large lawn bounded by Elizabeth Street, the diagonal path, the asphalt area and garden beds along William Street. A lily pond, recently rebuilt, is located adjacent to the intersection of the diagonal path and the asphalt area. On the southwestern side of the pond is a converted fountain, now a sandstone and concrete planter box. The diagonal path is emphasised by a row of colvillea trees (Colvillea racemosa). A coral tree (Erythrina spp.) marks the entrance to the park from George Street.

With the exception of specimen trees most of the planting in the park is kept at a low level so as not to divide the space visually. Barriers to movement, if not vision, are created along George Street by a zig-zag hedge (Acalypha) and along William Street by a chain wire fence, hedge and garden bed.

Although the design of the park is relatively recent, earlier monuments have been incorporated which provide links to the previous form of the site. Two bronze statues on stone pedestals remain in their original locations. A marble slab in the paved area indicates the position of the altar of the former St John's Pro-Cathedral.

A statue of Queen Victoria, is centrally positioned on the asphalt area in front of the symmetrical facade of the Lands Administration Building. The diagonal path is terminated by the monument which looks towards the Treasury Building and is framed by two leopard trees (Flindersia maculosa). The bronze statue stands on a pedestal, the upper portion of which is made of brown Helidon sandstone and the lower portion of Enoggera granite. The pedestal is square in form, with chamfered corners and is set on a flight of three granite steps. Directly behind the Queen is a 1915 Krupp gun.

The TJ Ryan statue also stands on a pedestal of Helidon sandstone and Enoggera granite. Separated from the main area of the park by a fence and garden, it is positioned diagonally facing the corner of William and Elizabeth Streets. An ornamental bronze plaque is attached to the pedestal.

A recent addition to the park's memorials is a rough hewn block of bluestone with a bronze plaque bolted to it that commemorates the service of Australian women in war. It is located on the southwestern side of the asphalt area between rose beds.

Timber and concrete benches are placed along the paths and around the lily pond. The original cast-iron lamp posts on cast-iron pedestals have been relocated along the paths. The planting is dominated by exotic plants with coloured foliage and decorative leaf shape. Many garden beds have plants clipped into geometric patterns.

The Gardens provide a foreground for viewing the principal facades of the Lands Administration Building, the former Library and the Family Services Building.

== Heritage listing ==
Queens Gardens was listed on the Queensland Heritage Register on 21 October 1992 having satisfied the following criteria.

The place is important in demonstrating the evolution or pattern of Queensland's history.

Queens Gardens are important in demonstrating the evolution of Queensland's history, particularly in the evolution of the site from convict administration use to the centre of Anglicanism in Queensland to public park and focus for Queensland's most important government precinct. Queens Gardens also demonstrate the historic and governmental associations of the Queen Victoria and TJ Ryan statues.

The place has potential to yield information that will contribute to an understanding of Queensland's history.

The site is significant for its potential to reveal substrata evidence of building materials and artefacts from the 1820s, which could contribute to an understanding of the early European settlement of Queensland.

The place is important in demonstrating the principal characteristics of a particular class of cultural places.

The present garden layout is important in demonstrating the principal characteristics of the work of influential landscape architect Harry Oakman, and is one of the most intact of his works surviving in Brisbane.

The place is important because of its aesthetic significance.

The gardens, together with the Queen Victoria and TJ Ryan statues, serve as the integrating core of a group of public buildings, and exhibit landscape and aesthetic qualities that are valued by the community.

The place has a special association with the life or work of a particular person, group or organisation of importance in Queensland's history.

The site has a special association with the Anglican Church and its early history in Queensland.

== See also ==
- Parks and gardens of Brisbane
