= First World War Honour Board, Lands Administration Building =

Heritage-listed memorial in Brisbane, Queensland

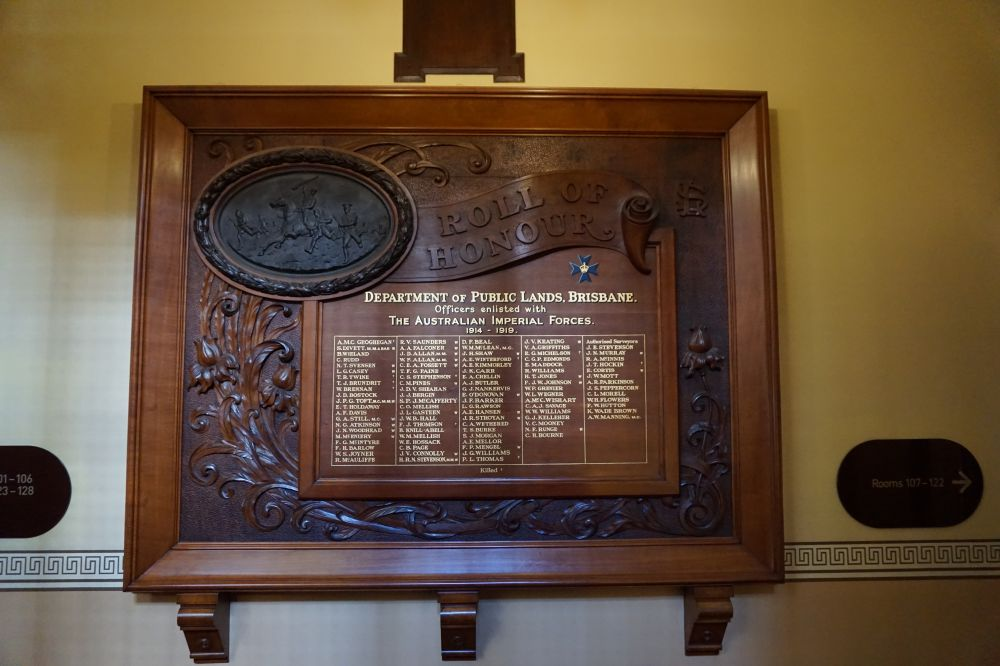
- First World War Honour Board

- Location within Queensland Location within Australia
- 27.4727°S 153.0246°E
- Location: Lands Administration Building, 142 George Street, Brisbane City, City of Brisbane, Queensland, Australia

History
- Design period: 1914–1919 (World War I)
- Built: 1917

Site notes
- Architect: Alexander Robertson McKellar

Queensland Heritage Register
- Official name: First World War Honour Board
- Type: state heritage (built)
- Designated: 21 October 1992
- Reference no.: 600117
- Significant period: 1917 (fabric); 1917 (historical, social)
- Significant components: memorial – honour board/ roll of honour
- Builders: George Varley Boyce

The First World War Honour Board is a heritage-listed memorial at the Lands Administration Building, 142 George Street, Brisbane City, City of Brisbane, Queensland, Australia. It was designed by Alexander Robertson McKellar and built in 1917 by George Varley Boyce. It was added to the Queensland Heritage Register on 21 October 1992.

== History ==
The First World War Honour Board was erected by employees of the Queensland Lands Department in 1917, as a tribute to fellow staff on active service.

The overall design was created by Alexander Robertson McKellar, a draftsman in the lithographic branch of the survey section. The affixed metal plaque was designed by Arnold Vivan Thomas, the officer in charge of the lithographic branch. Manufacture was carried out at the Queensland Government railway workshops at Ipswich, and the wood carving was crafted by noted local wood carver George Varley Boyce, who taught carving at Brisbane technical schools from c.1902 to 1916.

The honour board was unveiled by the then Governor of Queensland, Sir Hamilton Goold-Adams, on 2 May 1917.

It remains a focus for Anzac Day commemoration, with wreaths being laid before the honour board each 25 April. The board was restored by the Lands Department in 1981.

== Description ==
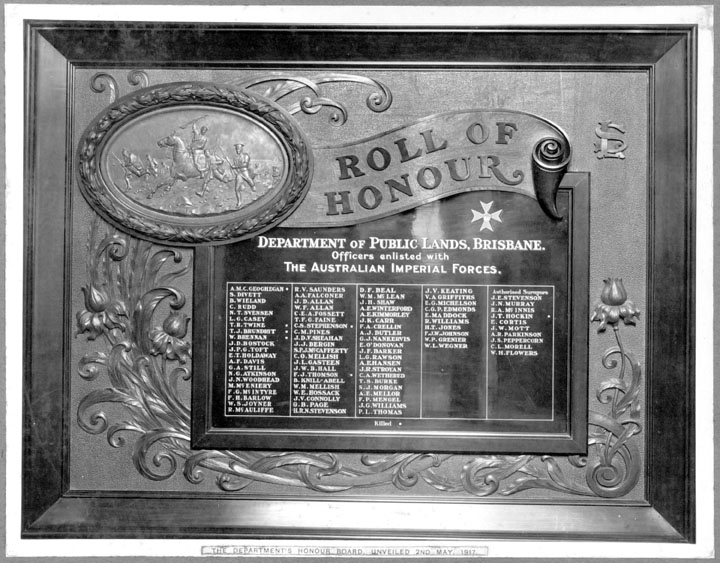
World War I Honour Board dedicated to the Queensland Lands Department Officers and some authorised surveyors who enlisted in the Australian Imperial Forces during the First World War, 1917

The honour board is affixed to the wall of the main corridor on the first floor of the Lands Administration Building in Brisbane, immediately opposite the George Street elevator.

It is a large honour board, 2 metres (6 ft 7 in) high by 2.5 metres (8 ft 2 in) wide, constructed of Queensland silky oak. A central panel of red bean bears the Queensland coat of arms and the gold-painted names of 94 departmental staff and authorised surveyors who served in the First World War. The surrounds are carved in a stippled pattern with lotus plants (an ancient symbol of sleep) in relief in the lower section. The latter rarely appear on Queensland war memorials.

Within a rich moulding of laurel leaves in the upper left hand corner is an oval-shaped metal plaque depicting in bas relief a cavalry charge and infantry soldiers advancing in battle, intended to illustrate the different fighting units in action. A carved scroll unfolds from the plaque and bears the relief lettering Roll of Honour.

The whole board is set into a simple frame.

== Heritage listing ==
First World War Honour Board was listed on the Queensland Heritage Register on 21 October 1992 having satisfied the following criteria.

The place is important in demonstrating the evolution or pattern of Queensland's history.

- As a unique record in Queensland of participation and sacrifice in the First World War.
- For its material richness, fine craftsmanship and unique design amongst Queensland war memorials.
- As the only identified public work of local Brisbane wood carver George Varley Boyce.

The place demonstrates rare, uncommon or endangered aspects of Queensland's cultural heritage.

- As a unique record in Queensland of participation and sacrifice in the First World War.

The place is important because of its aesthetic significance.

- For its material richness, fine craftsmanship and unique design amongst Queensland war memorials.

The place is important in demonstrating a high degree of creative or technical achievement at a particular period.

- For its material richness, fine craftsmanship and unique design amongst Queensland war memorials.

The place has a special association with the life or work of a particular person, group or organisation of importance in Queensland's history.

- As the only identified public work of local Brisbane wood carver George Varley Boyce.
