= Land Administration Building =

Heritage building in Australia

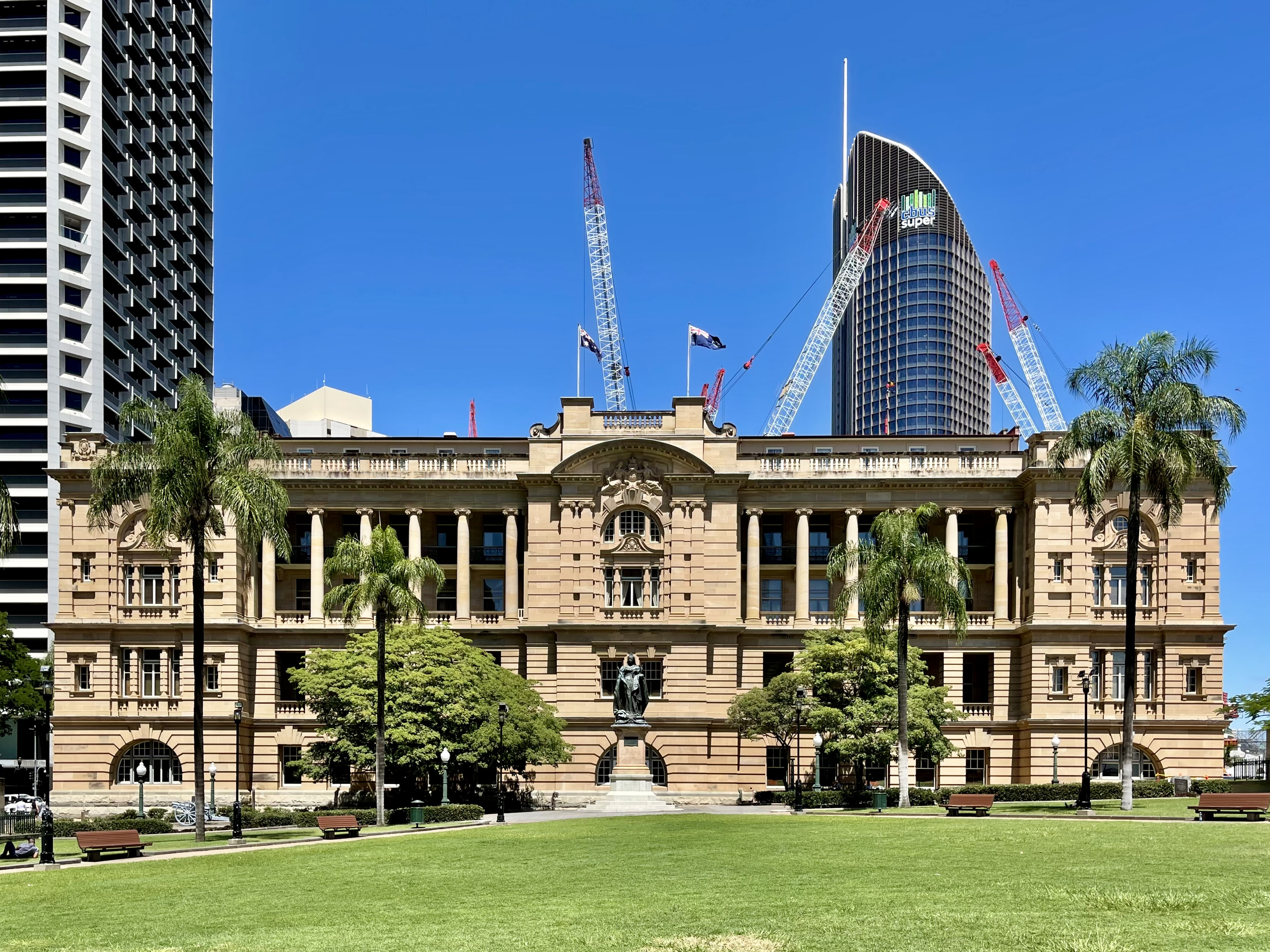
- Land Administration Building, Queens Gardens facade, 2016

- Location within Queensland
- 27.4727°S 153.0246°E
- Location: 142 George Street, Brisbane City, City of Brisbane, Queensland, Australia

History
- Design period: 1900–1914 (early 20th century)
- Built: 1899–1905
- Built for: Queensland Government

Site notes
- Architect: Thomas Pye
- Architectural style: Edwardian Baroque

Queensland Heritage Register
- Official name: Land Administration Building, Former Executive Building
- Type: state heritage (built)
- Designated: 21 October 1992
- Reference no.: 600123
- Significant period: 1900s early (fabric); 1900s–1970s (historical)
- Significant components: memorial – honour board/ roll of honour
- Builders: Arthur Midson

The Land Administration Building, known historically as the Executive Building or the Old Executive Building, is a heritage-listed former government building at 142 George Street, Brisbane, Australia. It was designed by Thomas Pye and built between 1899 and 1905 by Arthur Midson for the Government of the self-governing Colony of Queensland, which had become a state by the time of its completion. The Old Executive Building was added to the Queensland Heritage Register on 21 October 1992.

The building was originally occupied by the offices of the Lands and Survey Departments, the Premier of Queensland, the Executive Council, and the Queensland National Art Gallery. It contains a heritage-listed World War I Honour board.

Since 1995, the building has been used as the hotel of the Treasury Casino (the casino previously being located in the old Treasury Building, before moving to Queen’s Wharf in late 2024).

== History ==
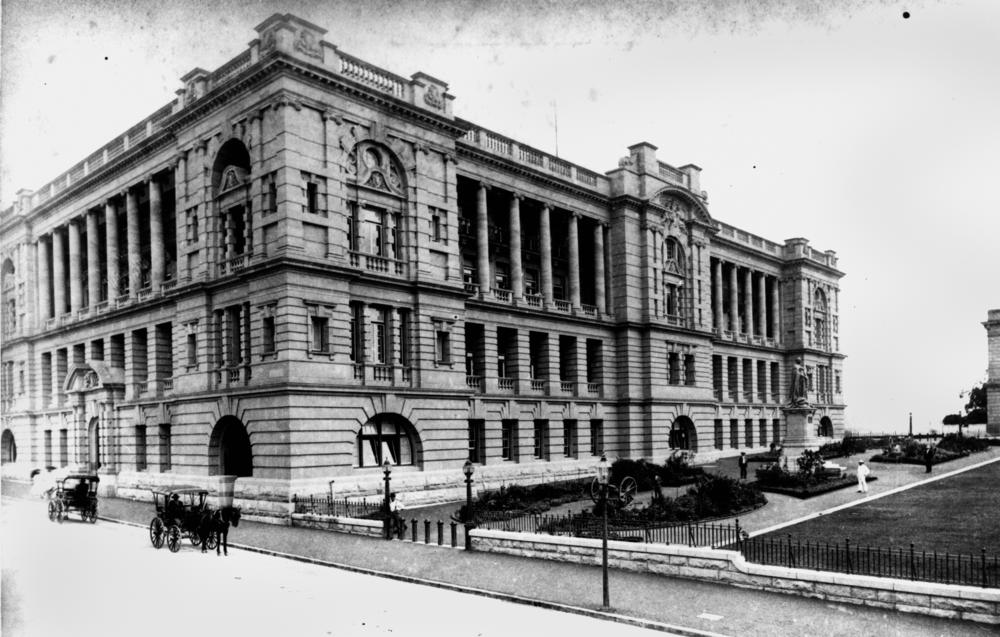
Executive Building, circa 1907

This four-storeyed masonry government office building was erected between 1901 and 1905. Initially intended as offices for the Lands and Survey Departments, it was finished and occupied in 1905 as the Executive Building, accommodating both the Lands and Survey Departments and offices of the Premier and Executive Council. It is the most prominent Brisbane example of Queensland Government building activity associated with the economic recovery of the late 1890s and with the Federation of Australia.

In 1898–1899 plans were prepared under the supervision of chief architect Thomas Pye of the Queensland Government Architect's office. Special provisions for the Lands Department included Minister's offices, drafting rooms, photographic and heliographic rooms, and a Land Court. With the inclusion of offices for the Executive Council and Cabinet, a separate entrance in George Street was designed for ministerial access.

A £2,900 contract for site preparation and foundations was commenced in 1899, and in 1901 the principal construction contract for £141,000 was let to Brisbane builder Arthur Midson.

The use of expanded metal lathing as a re-enforcement to the concrete floors and ceilings was amongst the earliest application of such technology in Australia, and was a first in Queensland.

The building was symbolic of Queensland's pride and achievement, and was seen as a showcase for Queensland materials. Granite used as the base course and plinth was obtained from Enoggera and Mount Crosby. Brown freestone from Helidon was used to face the outer walls, and freestone from Yangan near Warwick was used on the colonnade walls. The decorative carving to the facades was completed during 1903–1904. In the north-western elevation an allegorical group representing Queensland mining and agriculture was carved by New South Wales sculptor William Priestly MacIntosh to a design by Thomas Pye. The mantelpieces were constructed of a variety of Queensland timbers (maple, cedar, black bean and silky oak) representing the state's timber resources. Allegorical stained glass highlighted the rural nature of the Queensland economy.

From 1901, the Queensland National Art Gallery occupied a purpose-designed room the length of the third floor above George Street. In 1930 the art gallery was relocated to the Exhibition Building Concert Hall .

Both Executive Council and Cabinet met in the building from 1905 until 1971, when new offices were constructed at 100 George Street, known as the Executive Building. Since then this former Executive Building has been known as the Land Administration Building.

The gas lamps on the pavements at the William and George Street entrances were erected by about 1911. Those delineating the George Street entrance appear to have been moved further apart. They still function, lit by natural gas.

== Description ==
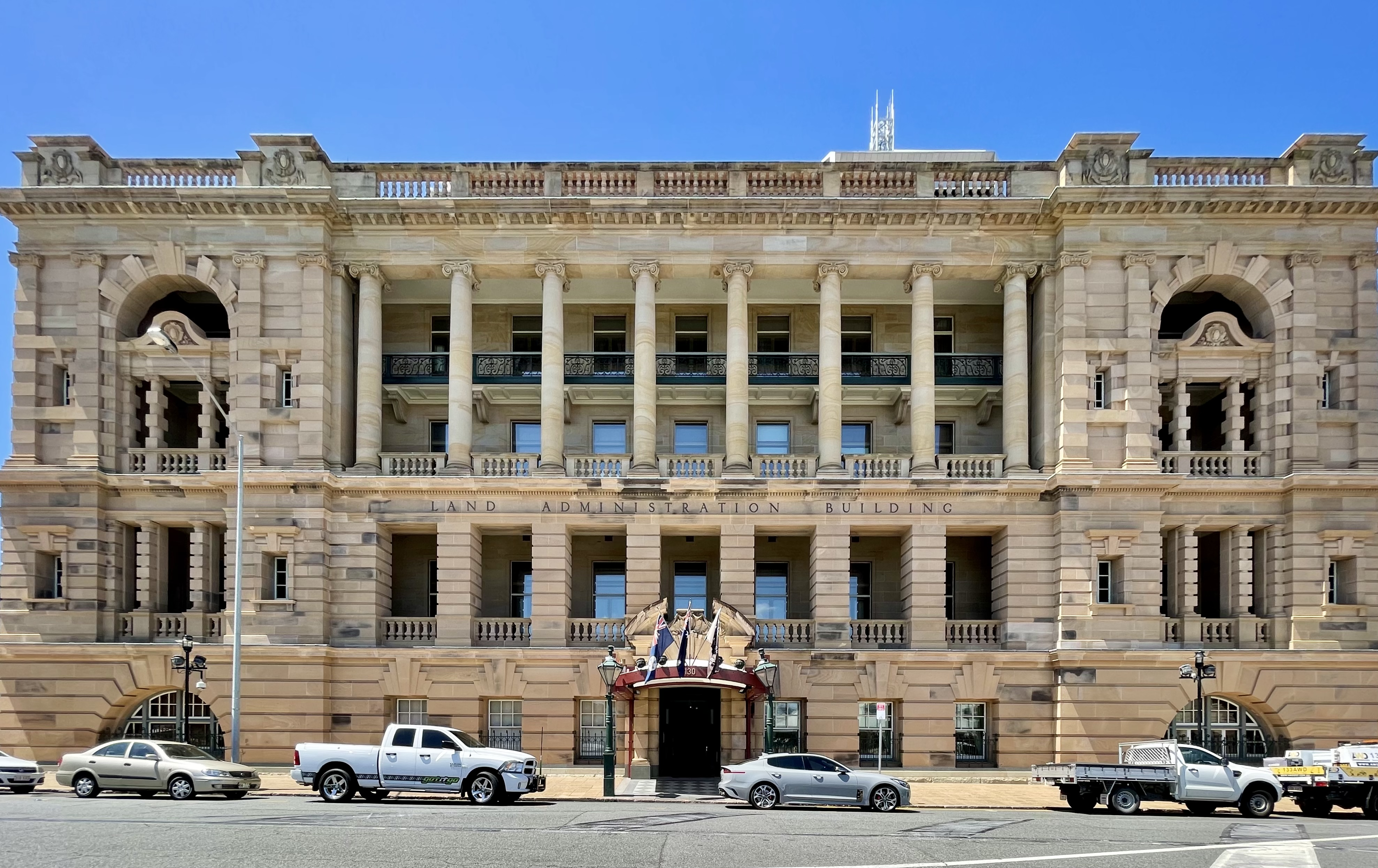
Land Administration Building, William Street façade, Brisbane, 2021

The Lands Administration Building is a four-storeyed government office building occupying a site bounded by George Street, Stephens Lane, William Street and Queens Gardens. The form and scale of the building complement the Treasury Building and the Old State Library located nearby. It forms the southeastern edge of the important group of government buildings surrounding Queens Gardens, which also includes the Family Services Building and the William Street retaining wall.

The building is constructed of masonry, steel and concrete and faced with sandstone from Helidon and Warwick. It sits on a plinth faced with alternate courses of Enoggera and Mount Crosby granite. The principal elevation to Queens Gardens and the elevations to George and William Streets have banded rustication on the lower two storeys. This two-storeyed base supports a colonnade of Giant order Ionic columns.

The design of the facades is in the style of the Edwardian Baroque. At each corner and in the centre of the principal elevation, pavilions jut out terminating the colonnade. The pavilions are enriched with rusticated columns and pilasters. The central pavilion addressing Queens Park is surmounted by an open segmental pediment. This pediment supports an allegorical sculpture depicting agriculture and mining.

The building has an entrance in the centre of both the George Street and William Street elevations. Each entrance is marked with a broken segmental pediment. Behind the upper colonnades there is a long recessed balcony. The use of fine wrought iron detail to balustrades, railings and gates complements the masonry detail.

The stained glass in the entrance vestibules and elsewhere in the interior complements the use of sculpture externally. Depicted in stained glass in the William Street vestibule is a sower, a reaper, a pioneer and squatter. The glass in the George Street vestibule depicts a tiller and a herdsman. A marble tablet set into the wall of this entrance is inscribed with the message sent by King George V to the people of Australia on 25 April 1916, establishing the Anzac Day tradition. An honour board commemorating Lands Department staff who served in the First World War is located in the corridor on the first floor.

The basic form of the building echoes the layout of the Treasury building. It is a perimeter block building around a central courtyard. A wide hallway runs around most of the building with doorways on either side opening onto rooms that are lit via windows to the courtyard or to the street or garden. The hallway does not continue through the centre of that part of the building located on Stephens Lane. Rooms in this wing are accessed from an arcade on the northeastern edge of the courtyard. Cast-iron balconies also provide circulation around the courtyard. Vertical circulation is provided by fine staircases and lifts associated with the two street entrances. The design also echoes the Treasury building by providing colonnades on the three main elevations.

The construction demonstrates an early use of reinforced concrete floors in a large scale building. Steel framing was employed in the roofs over the photographic rooms on the top floor and over the fireproofed sections. Metal roller shutters were installed in the fireproof sections.

The principal architectural spaces include rooms formerly used for the Executive Council Chamber, the Land Court, and offices of the Premier and the Minister of Lands, which have a private stairway to George Street. These rooms have ornamental coffered plaster ceilings and timber panelling to dado height. The former Executive Council Chamber has three stained glass windows positioned above the dado which can also be seen from the hallway.

The building is very intact, internally and externally.

== Heritage listing ==
Land Administration Building was listed on the Queensland Heritage Register on 21 October 1992 having satisfied the following criteria.

The place is important in demonstrating the evolution or pattern of Queensland's history.

As the most important building constructed by the Queensland government during the economic recovery of the early 1900s, the Lands Administration Building is important in demonstrating the pattern of Queensland's history.

The place is important in demonstrating the principal characteristics of a particular class of cultural places.

The highly intact Lands Administration Building is important in demonstrating the principal characteristics of Edwardian Baroque public architecture, and is the finest example of its type constructed in Queensland.

The place is important because of its aesthetic significance.

The building is important in exhibiting particular aesthetic characteristics valued by the community, and by architectural historians in particular, the accomplished design, detailing, materials and workmanship, its townscape contribution, particularly in relation to the adjacent buildings and sites and the aesthetic quality and connotations of the associated artworks and furnishings, including the stained glass and sculptural work.

The place has a strong or special association with a particular community or cultural group for social, cultural or spiritual reasons.

The Queensland Heritage Register listing states that the Lands Administration Building has a strong association with the role and prestige of government, as part of a prominent group of government buildings in Queensland.

The place has a special association with the life or work of a particular person, group or organisation of importance in Queensland's history.

The Lands Administration Building has a strong and special association with the role and prestige of government, being an integral member of the most prominent, important and cohesive group of government buildings in Queensland.

The building has a special association with Queensland Executive government for nearly seven decade and with important Queensland architect Thomas Pye, being one of his major works.

== Gallery ==
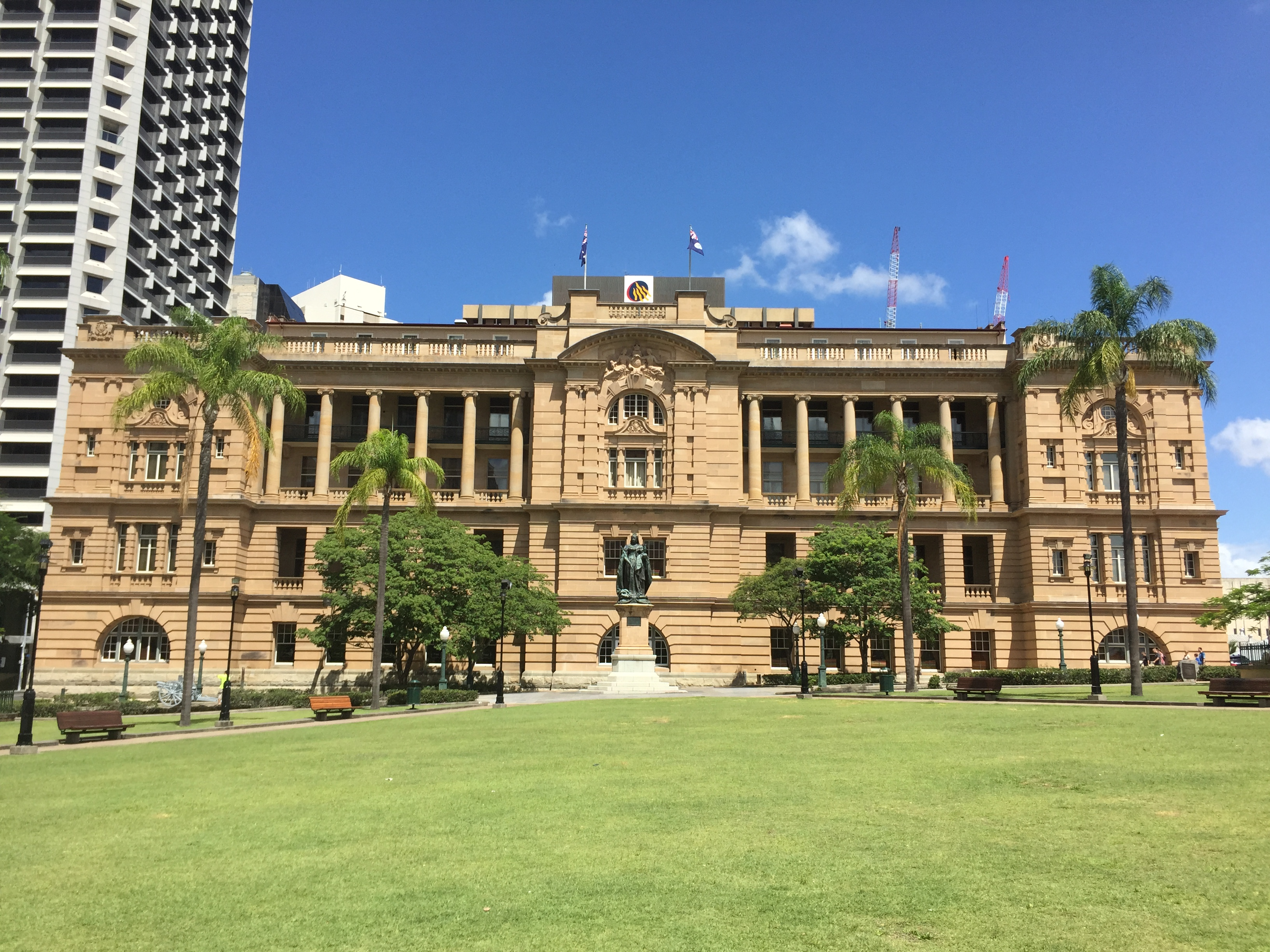
Land Administration Building, Queens Gardens facade, showing a statue of Queen Victoria

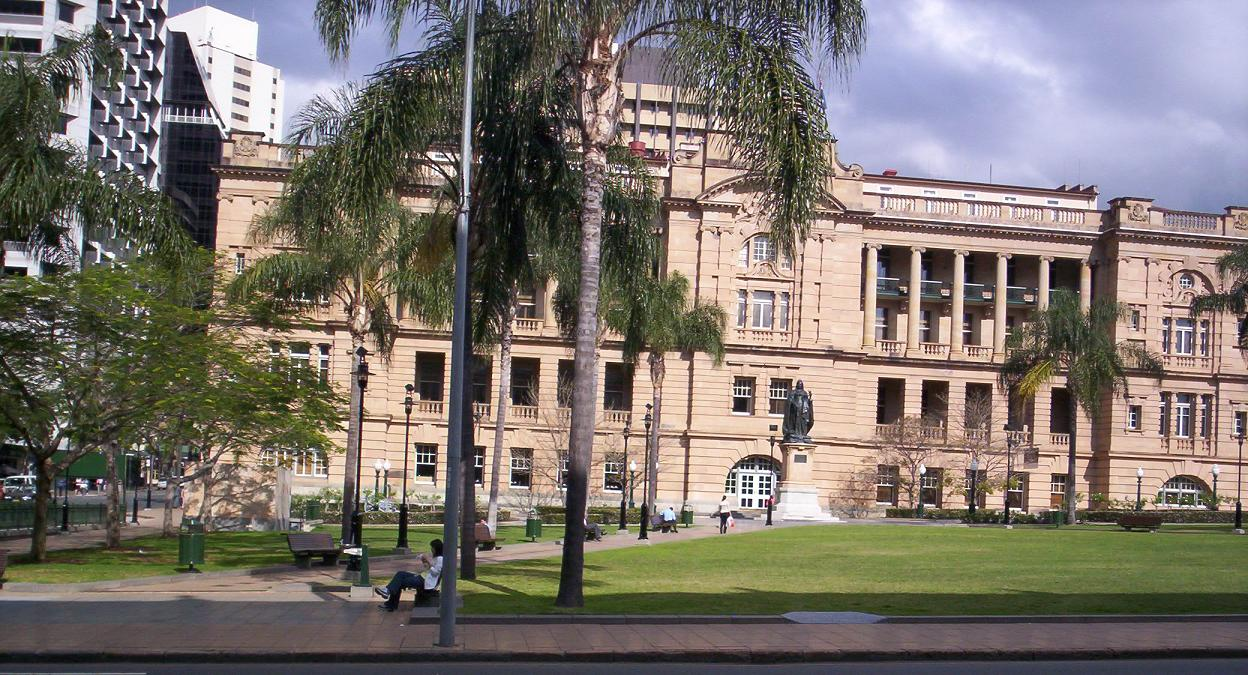
Land Administration Building, Queens Gardens facade
