= Treasury Casino =

Casino in Brisbane, Australia

Coordinates: 27°28′21″S 153°1′28″E

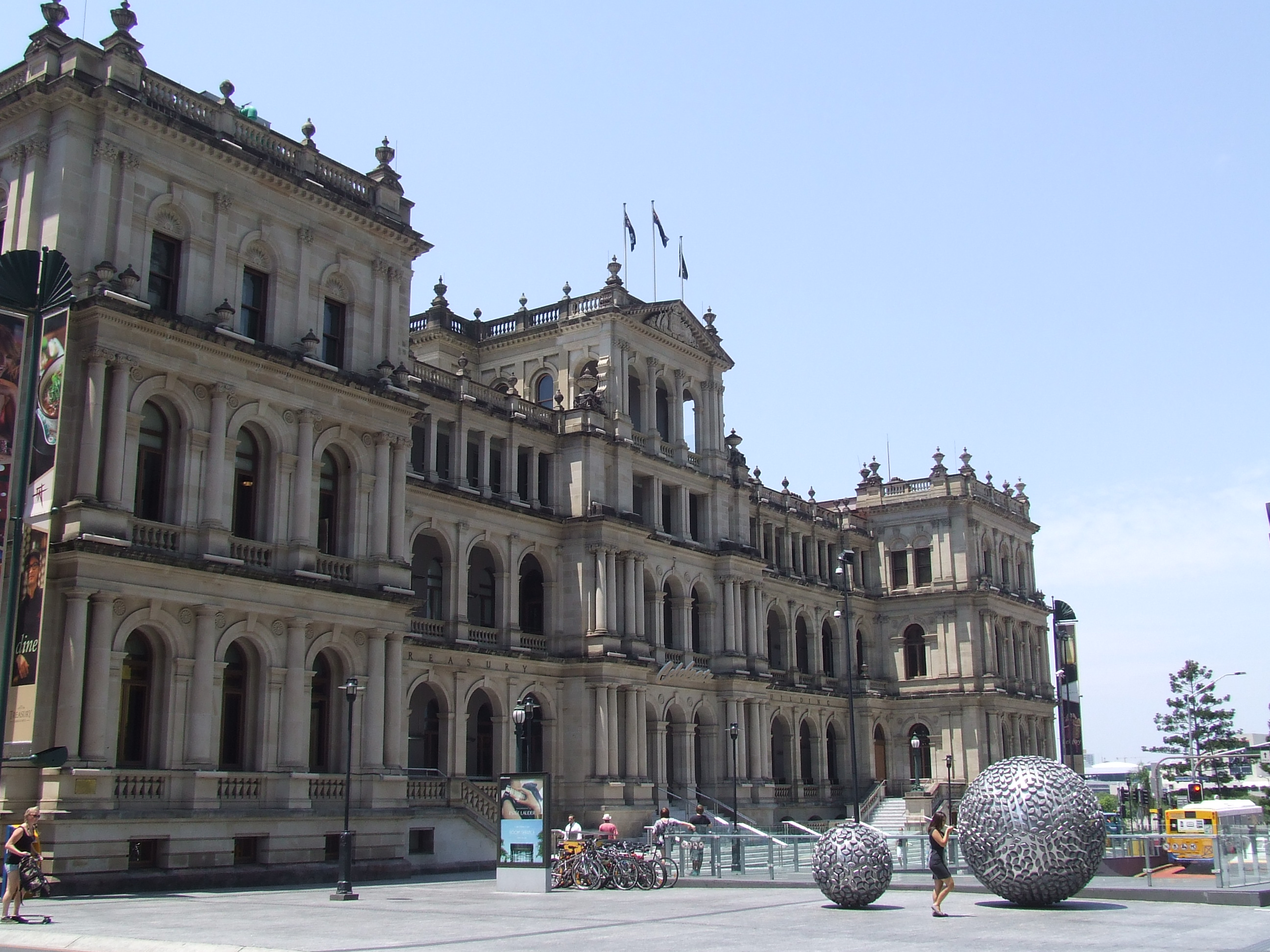
- Interactive map of Treasury Casino
- Location: Brisbane, Queensland; Cnr George & Elizabeth Streets, Brisbane
- Opened: April 1995
- Closed: 25 August 2024
- Casino type: Land-based
- Owner: Star Entertainment Group
- Website: www.treasurybrisbane.com.au

The Treasury Casino, also simply known as The Treasury, was a casino in Brisbane, Queensland, Australia. It also had a hotel, 6 restaurants, 5 bars, and a nightclub. The casino was operated by Star Entertainment Group. It closed on 25 August 2024 to make way for a new Star Casino at Queen's Wharf.

One percent of the casino's gross gaming revenue was deposited in the Jupiters Casino Community Benefit Fund. This fund supported non-profit community-based groups and is administered by the Government of Queensland.

== Origins ==
The casino and hotel occupied two heritage-listed buildings, the Treasury Building, and the nearby Lands Administration Building respectively. The buildings are separated by Queens Gardens. A 700-vehicle car park is located beneath the park.

== Architecture and refurbishment ==
An early 19th-century building with Edwardian-Baroque exterior designs and ornate colonnades, striking sandstone walls and six-story atrium, the historic Treasury Building housed a three-level gaming emporium of 80 gaming tables and over 1,300 gaming machines, and was opened refurbished as the Treasury Casino in April 1995. The hotel section of the Conrad Treasury Casino is housed in the former Lands Administration Building.

There were also function rooms, ranging from early 19th-century decor to modern business meeting rooms.

== Gaming ==
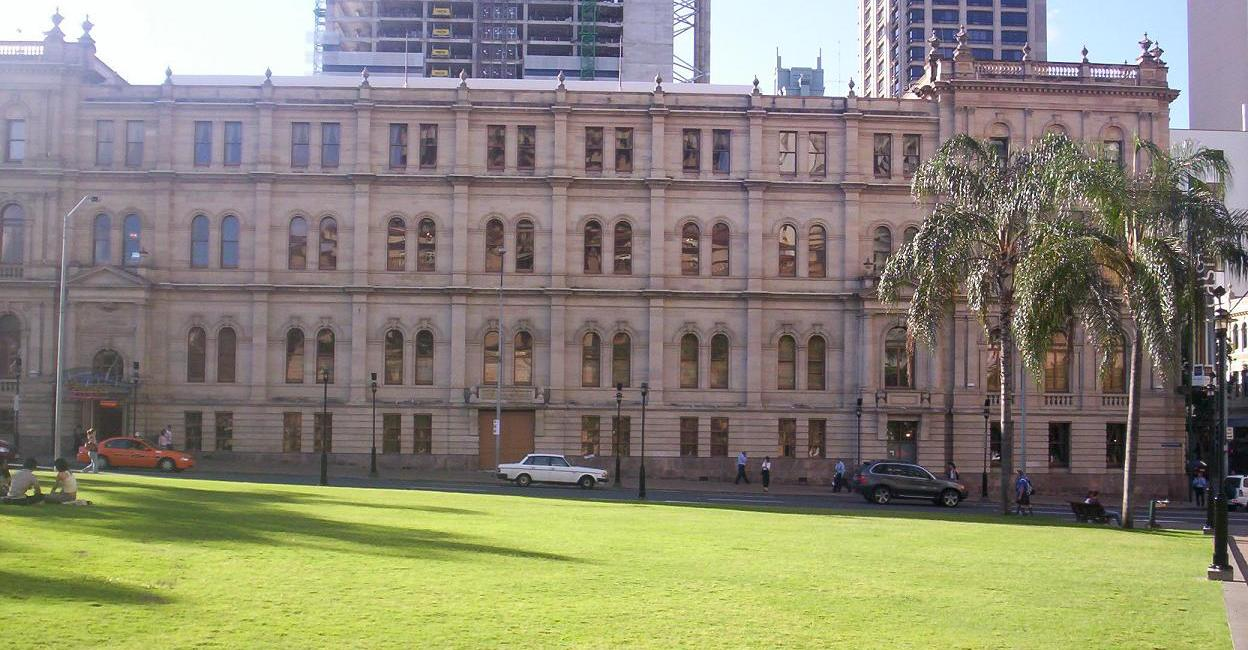
Conrad Treasury Casino building – Elizabeth Street façade (photo taken from Queens Gardens)

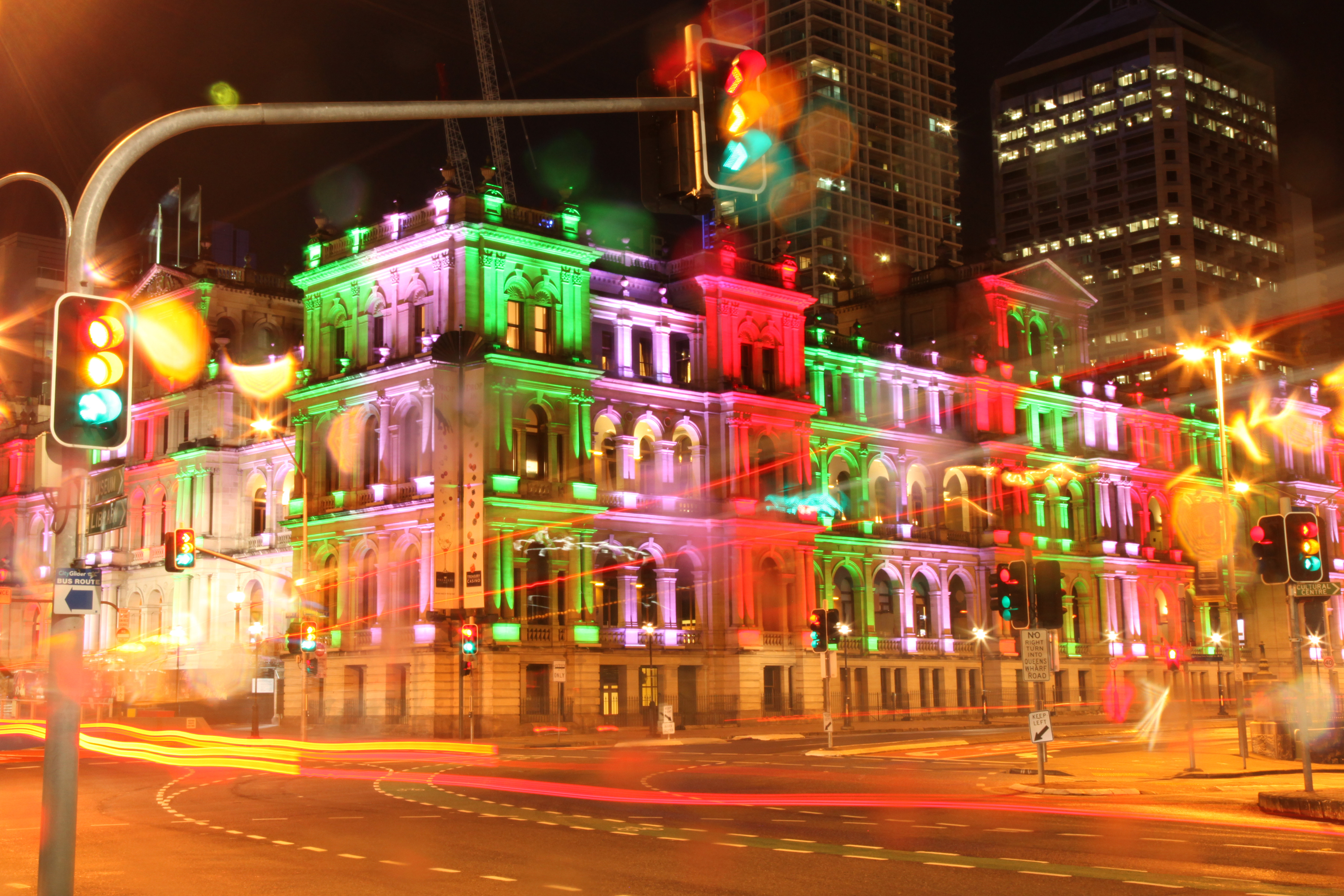
Treasury Casino at night, taken from the corner of Victoria Bridge & North Quay, Brisbane

The Treasury Casino offered a number of gambling games including: Blackjack, Treasury 21 (a variant of Spanish 21), mini Baccarat (card game), Treasury Wheel (Australian Big Six wheel), Caribbean Stud Poker, Roulette, Craps, 3-Card Poker, Sic Bo, and Slot Machines. In addition, there was also a poker room offering Texas hold'em poker and Omaha cash games along with regular poker tournaments.

== Queen's Wharf ==
As part of the Queen's Wharf development by the Star Entertainment Group and Chow Tai Fook Enterprises, a new casino opened in 2024.

== See also ==
- Tourism in Brisbane
