= Treasury Building, Brisbane =

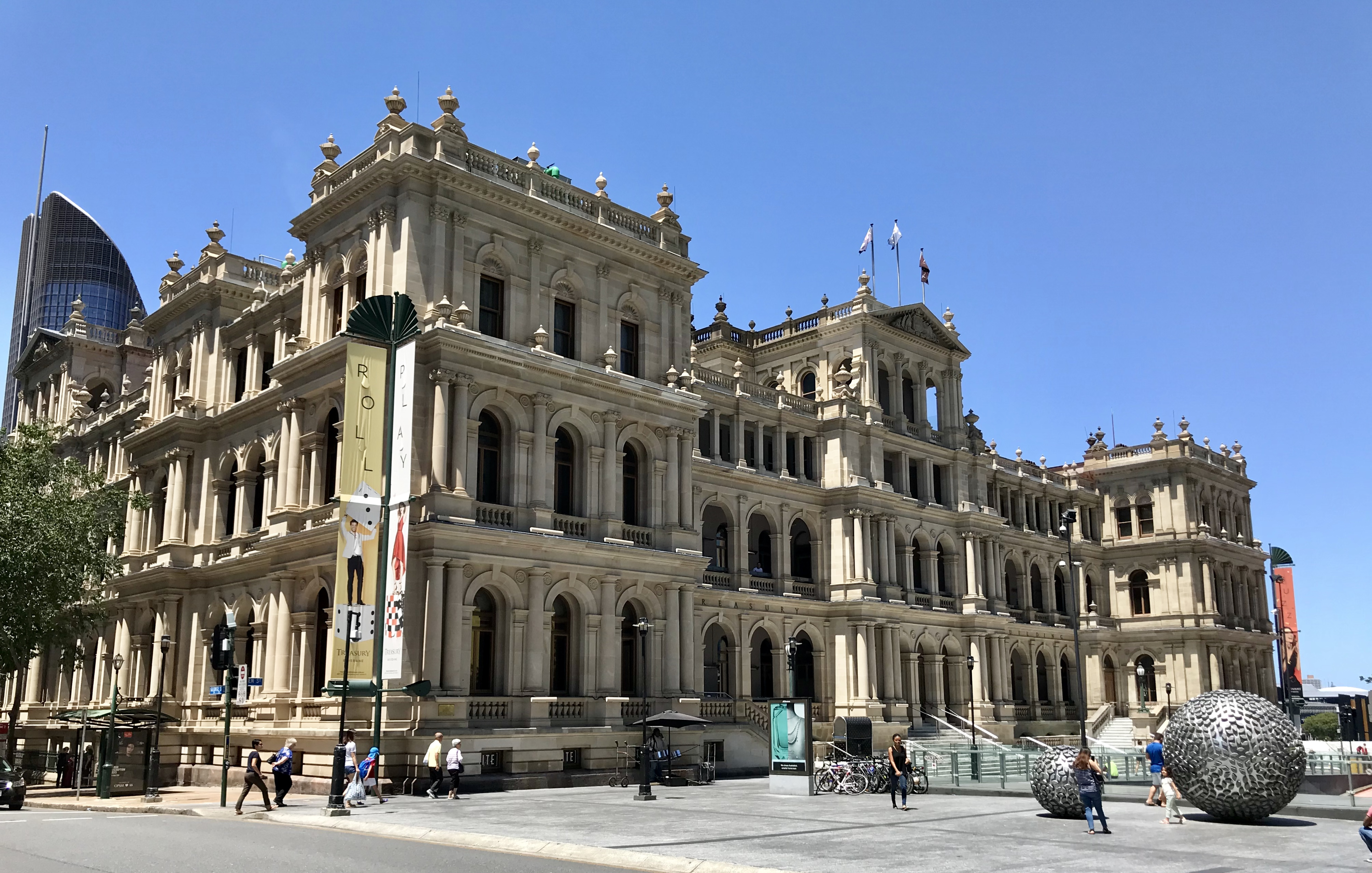
- Queen Street facade of the Treasury Building
- Alternative names: The Treasury

General information
- Architectural style: Italian Renaissance
- Location: Brisbane Square, Brisbane, 21 Queen Street (on the block bounded by Queen Street, George Street, Elizabeth Street, and William Street), Brisbane city, Queensland
- Current tenants: None (undergoing renovations)
- Inaugurated: 8 April 1930
- Owner: Griffith University

Design and construction
- Architecture firm: John James Clark
- Location within Queensland
- 27°28′18″S 153°01′25″E
- Location: 21 Queen Street, Brisbane City, City of Brisbane, Queensland, Australia

History
- Design period: 1870s–1890s (late 19th century)
- Built: 1886–1928

Queensland Heritage Register
- Official name: Treasury Building, New Public Offices, Treasury Casino
- Type: State heritage (built)
- Designated: 21 October 1992
- Reference no.: 600143
- Significant period: 1880s–1920s (fabric); 1880s–1980s (historical)
- Significant components: wall/s

The Treasury Building, previously known as the New Public Offices, is a heritage-listed former public administration building located at 21 Queen Street in Brisbane, and is the largest 19th-century government building in Australia by gross floor area. It was built from 1886 to 1928 for the Queensland Government. On 21 October 1992 the Italian Renaissance building was added to the Queensland Heritage Register.

The building is located at North Quay, near the northern end of Victoria Bridge. Although officially fronting on Queen Street, the building occupies an entire city block surrounded by Queen Street, George Street, Elizabeth Street and William Street. The Elizabeth Street frontage is opposite the Queens Gardens. In the 1890s and early 1900s the imposing Treasury Building served as a symbol of self-government and as a focus for celebratory and patriotic displays.

From 1995 to 2024 the building was occupied by the Treasury Casino and owned by Star Entertainment Group. In September 2024, Griffith University announced that they would be purchasing the building to use as a new inner-city teaching campus.

== History ==
The Treasury Building was erected in three stages between 1886 and 1928.

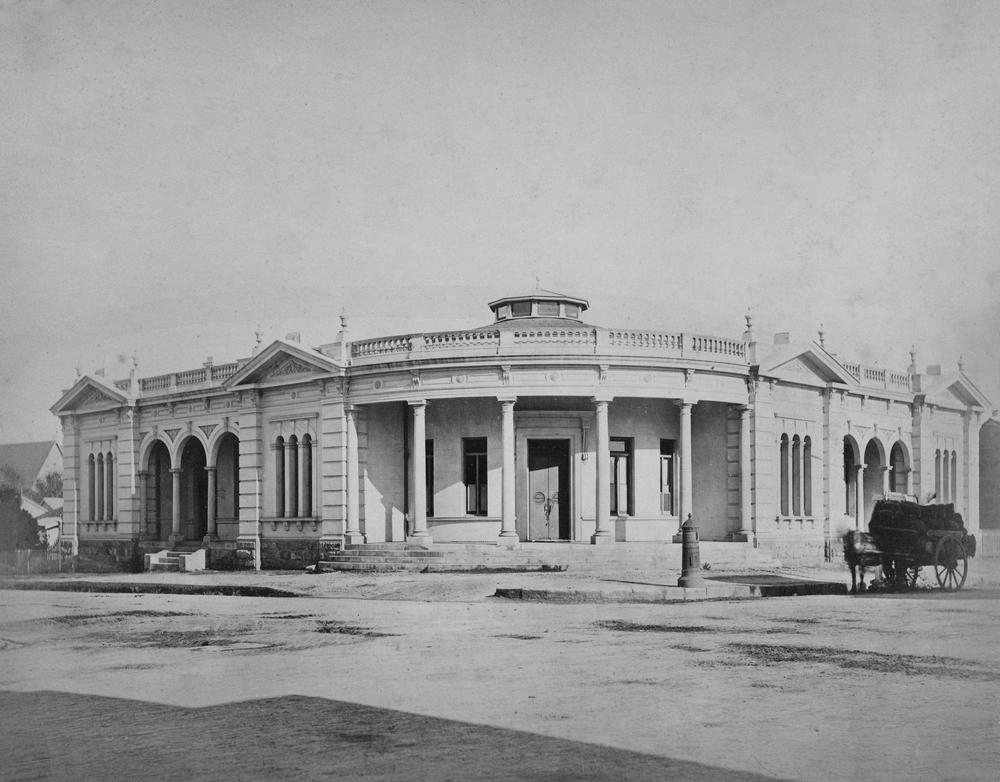
Registrar-General's Office on the corner of Queen and George Streets, 1875

The site at the junction of the George Street and Queen Street had been reserved for government purposes from 1825. It was occupied initially by convict-built officers' quarters and a two-storey military barracks. In 1864 the military moved from the site and the existing buildings were occupied by the Registrar-General, Treasury and Engineer of Harbours. In 1874, a single-storeyed building for the Registrar-General was erected on the corner of George and Queen Streets, anticipating a government re development of what had become known as Treasury Square.

In 1883, the Queensland Government decided to construct new public offices on Treasury Square. A design competition, for a two-storeyed perimeter block to occupy the entire square, was won by Melbourne architects Grainger and D'Ebro, but their design was never used. The newly appointed Queensland colonial architect, John James Clark, argued that the site warranted a four-storeyed complex, to be erected in stages as government accommodation was required. Clark's own neo-Italianate design, entered in the competition prior to his appointment as Queensland colonial architect in September 1883, was used.

Clark is significant in Australian architectural history. He received his training and experience in the architectural office of the Victorian Department of Public Works, and designed major public buildings in Victoria (e.g. the Old Treasury Building in Melbourne), Queensland and Western Australia.

Documentation for the first stage of the Treasury Building, which fronted William Street and the Brisbane River and returned a short distance down Elizabeth and Queen Streets, was completed by mid-1885, and site preparation followed immediately. Tenders for the main contract were called in April 1886, and Sydney builders Phippard Bros & Co. were successful with a contract price of £94,697/10/-. The principal architect on site was Thomas Pye, who resigned from the colonial architect's office in February 1887 to supervise the construction as a Phippard Bros employee.

When completed in September 1889, the new centre of government administration in Queensland was occupied by the Premier, Colonial Secretary, Registrar-General (in a purpose-built fire-proof section at the corner of William and Elizabeth Streets), Treasury, Mines, Works, Police and Auditor-General. It was home to the Cabinet and frequently to the Executive Council from late 1889 to 1905. In 1905 the Premier's Department moved into the Executive Building (subsequently known as the Lands Administration Building) in George Street.

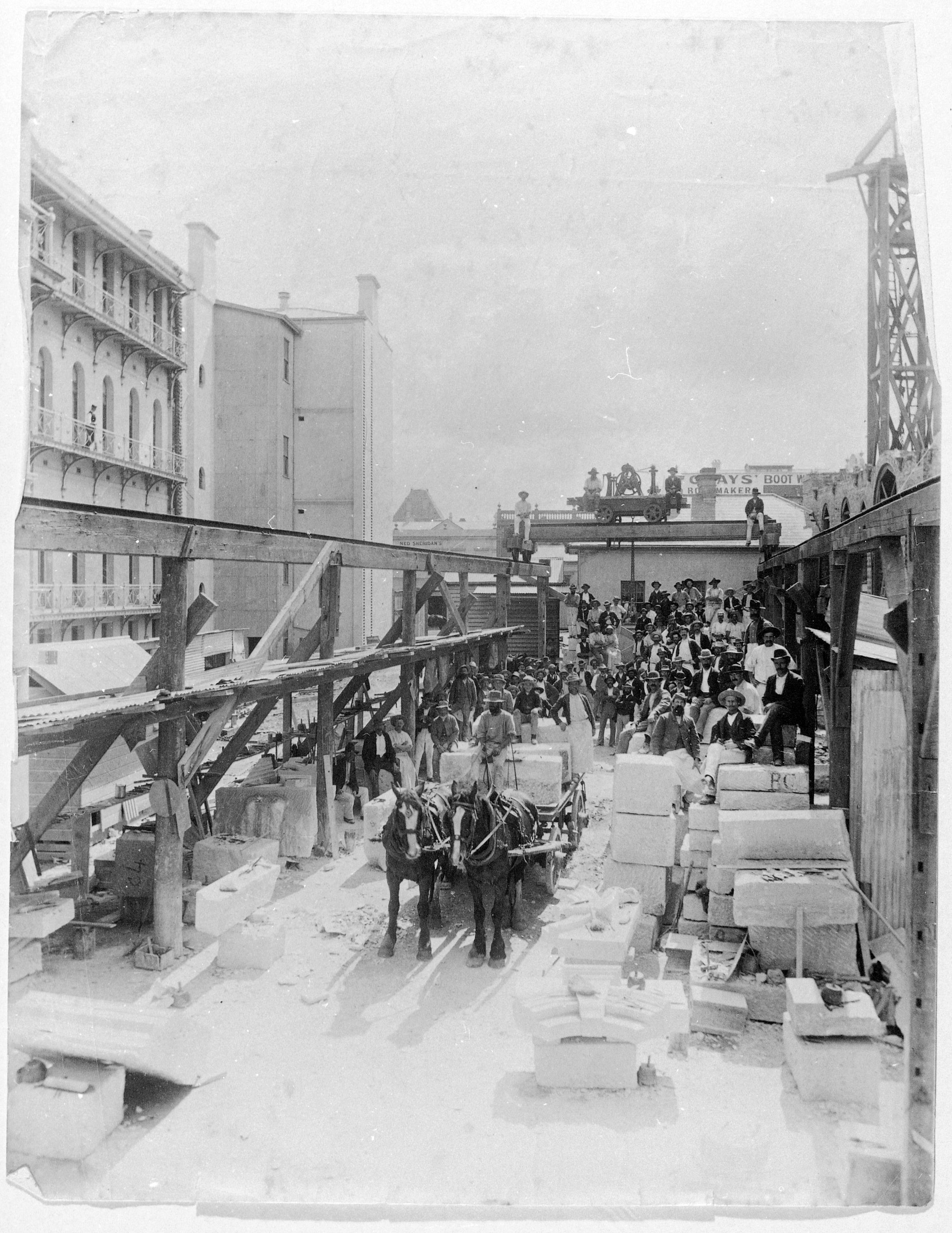
Construction work on stage 2, 1893

Stage two, which completed the Elizabeth Street section and continued two-thirds of the way along the George Street frontage, was commenced almost immediately. The documentation and working drawings were prepared by Thomas Pye, re-employed by the colonial architect's office to supervise the project. Tenders were called in April 1890, and the principal contract was let to builder John Jude of Adelaide, with a contract price of £67,000.

The contract was completed by February 1893 and the new wing was occupied in the middle of that year by the Registrar of Titles, Justice, Works, Public Instruction and the State Savings Bank, for whom a purpose-built banking chamber was included in the design which in all other details replicated stage one. Later in 1893 the courtyard was landscaped with a grass oval surrounded by a gravel carriageway, border planting, and trees.

The site then consisted of stages one and two of the Treasury Building, and the 1874 office of the Registrar-General.

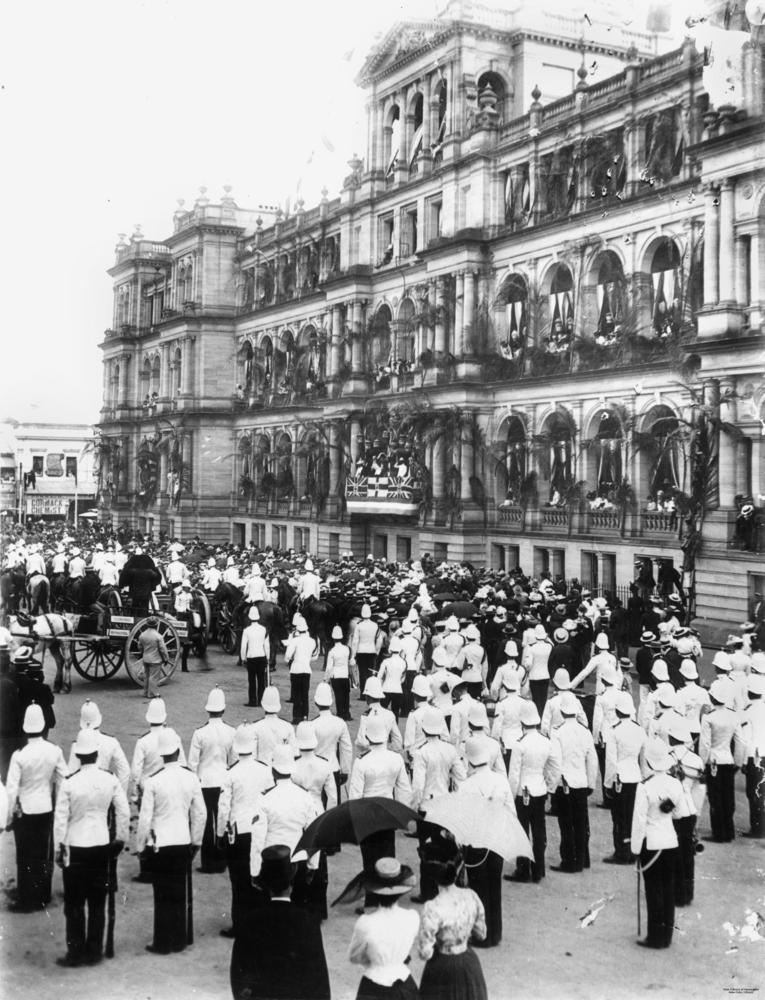
Lord Lamington addressing the crowds on Federation Day, 1901

In the 1890s and early 1900s the imposing Treasury Building served as a symbol of self-government and as a focus for celebratory and patriotic displays. In 1901, the proclamation of the Federation of Australia was read by the Governor of Queensland Baron Lamington from a balcony on the William Street elevation.

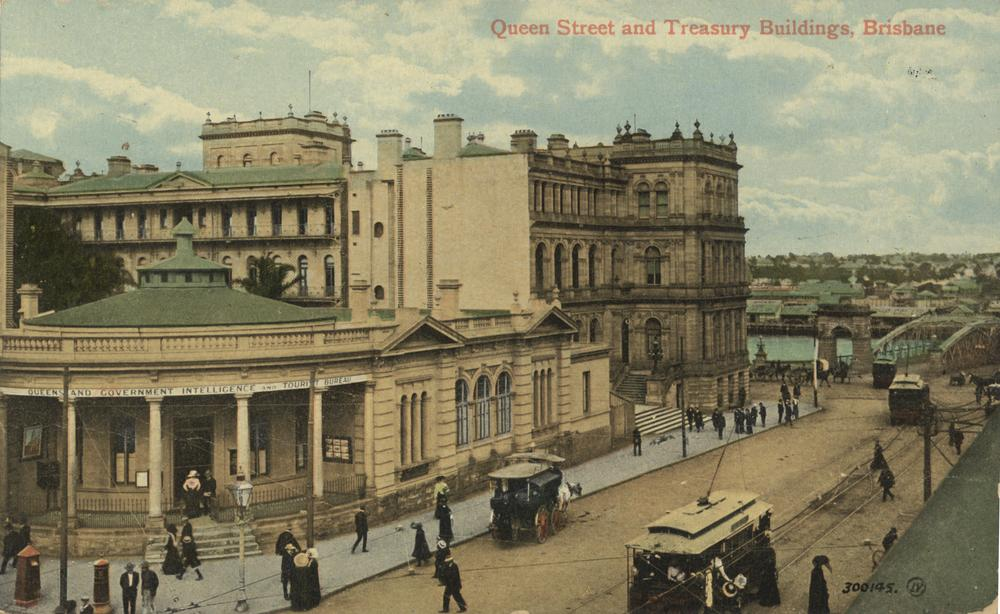
Treasury Building after Stage 2 with the Registrar-General's building still on the corner of Queen and George Streets, circa 1907. The internal walls facing the internal courtyard can be seen.

Owing to the construction around the turn of the century of new offices for the Department of Agriculture and the Executive Building (Land Administration Building), which provided additional Queensland Government accommodation, work on the third stage of the Treasury Building was not started until 1922. The Registrar-General's building was demolished late 1922/early 1923, and construction commenced in mid-1923, using day labour. This was deliberate government encouragement of state enterprise, as was the government acquisition of Millers Quarries at Helidon to provide the stone.

The front elevation of the third section differed only slightly from Clark's original concept, although structurally and in internal materials and fittings it was a 1920s building. It was completed, occupied and opened officially in 1928 at a final cost of £137,817, providing expanded accommodation for existing Treasury Building tenants.

In the 1950s, demand for further accommodation led to the construction in 1961 of a five-storeyed annex in the courtyard. In 1971 the Treasury and Works Departments moved to the new Executive Building at 100 George Street, thus severing the Treasury Building's connection with these principal government departments. The annex was demolished in 1987, in anticipation of a major government refurbishment of the site.

From 1989 to 1993, the Registrar-General has remained the sole occupant of the Treasury Building (an occupancy of 100 years), but it continued to be the best known and identifiable government office building in Queensland.

In 1992, a decision was made to repurpose the Treasury Building and the Lands Administration Building as the Treasury Casino and its associated Treasury Hotel (not to be confused with earlier heritage-listed Treasury Hotel). Following a conservation project which commenced in 1993, the casino and hotel opened on 19 April 1995.

On Sunday 25 August 2024, the Treasury Casino closed in anticipation of the opening of the new casino at Queen's Wharf.

On 6 September 2024, Griffith University announced that they would be purchasing the Treasury Building to use as a new inner-city campus. The historic building is set to accommodate students and staff from the Schools of Business, Information Technology and Law, and will also serve as a “centre for postgraduate and executive education”. The new campus is set to open in 2027, in time for the 2032 Summer Olympic Games.

== Description ==
The Treasury Building, a four-storeyed masonry perimeter block, occupies an entire city block bounded by Queen, George, Elizabeth and William Streets. It forms the northern edge of the group of important public buildings surrounding Queens Gardens. These include the Lands Administration Building to the southeast of the park, the Family Services Building to the northeast, and on the southwestern edge, between the gardens and the Brisbane River, the Old State Library and the North Quay porphyry wall. Like the Treasury Building, the gardens, neighbouring buildings and wall are all heritage-listed.

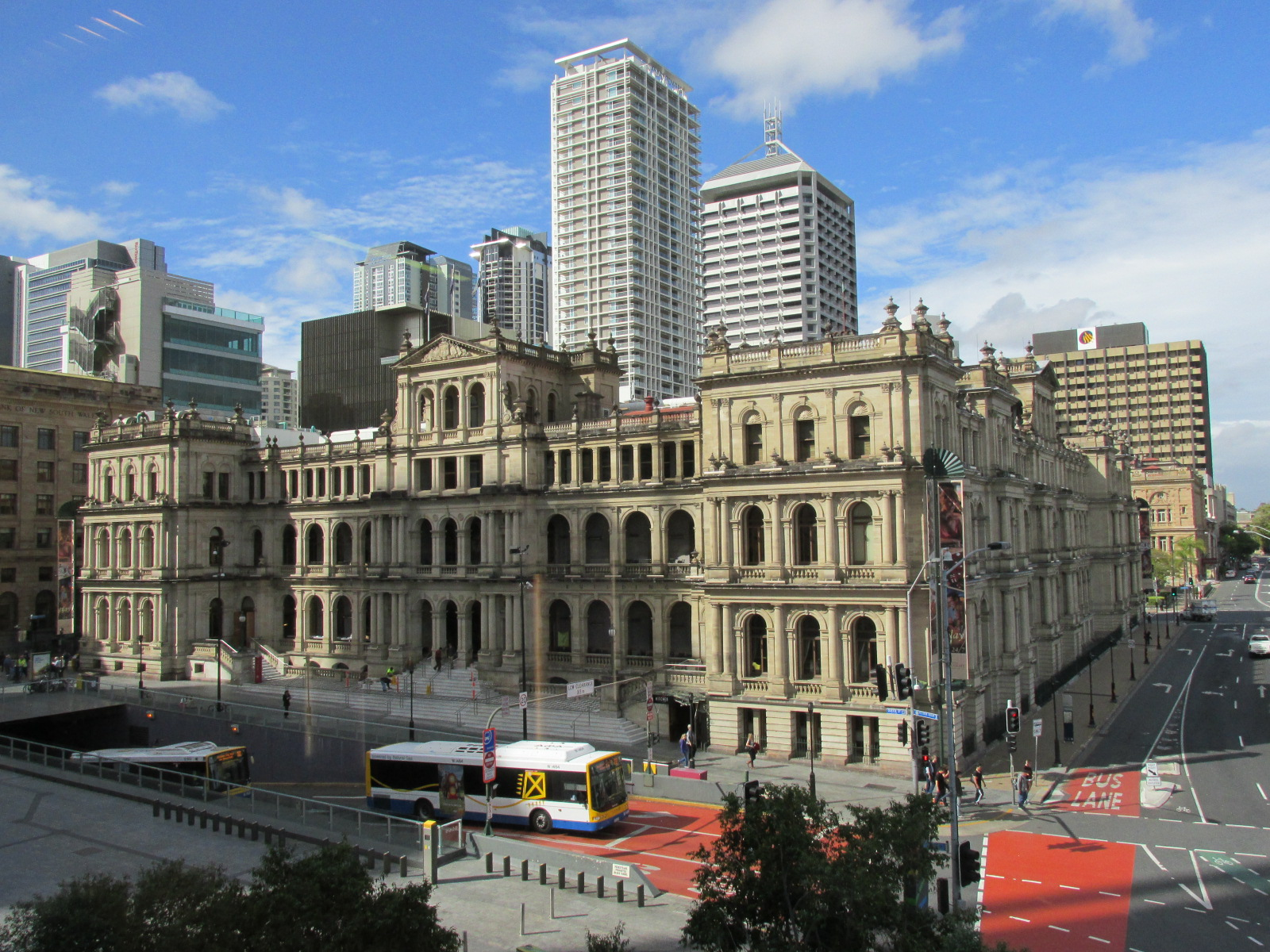
William Street facade completed in the first stage, 2014

The view of the William Street facade from the river, although interrupted by South-East Freeway, is enhanced by the elevated position of the site. The building consists of a partly sunken basement and an elevated ground floor or piano nobile above which are two additional floors. It is built to the property alignment around a large central courtyard.

The design is consistent with English practice of the late nineteenth century in employing a classical style drawn from sixteenth-century Italian architecture. Arcades protect the northeast, northwest and southwest elevations. The arcaded facades are symmetrical with central towers of one additional storey surmounted by a pediment. The corners are emphasised with pavilions which step forward terminating the arcades. The basement walls are distinguished by smooth banded rustication. The southeast facade has no arcade and no central tower.

The building is faced with sandstone ashlar except for the inner walls of the arcade. These brick walls are finished with lined and unpainted render imitating ashlar. Each phase of construction has used a different type of sandstone. A colour difference is discernible between the Highfields stone used for the first phase of construction, and the Helidon sandstones used for the later stages. The external walls sit on a porphyry plinth. A matching porphyry dwarf wall adjoins the building on some elevations surmounted by a wrought iron fence.

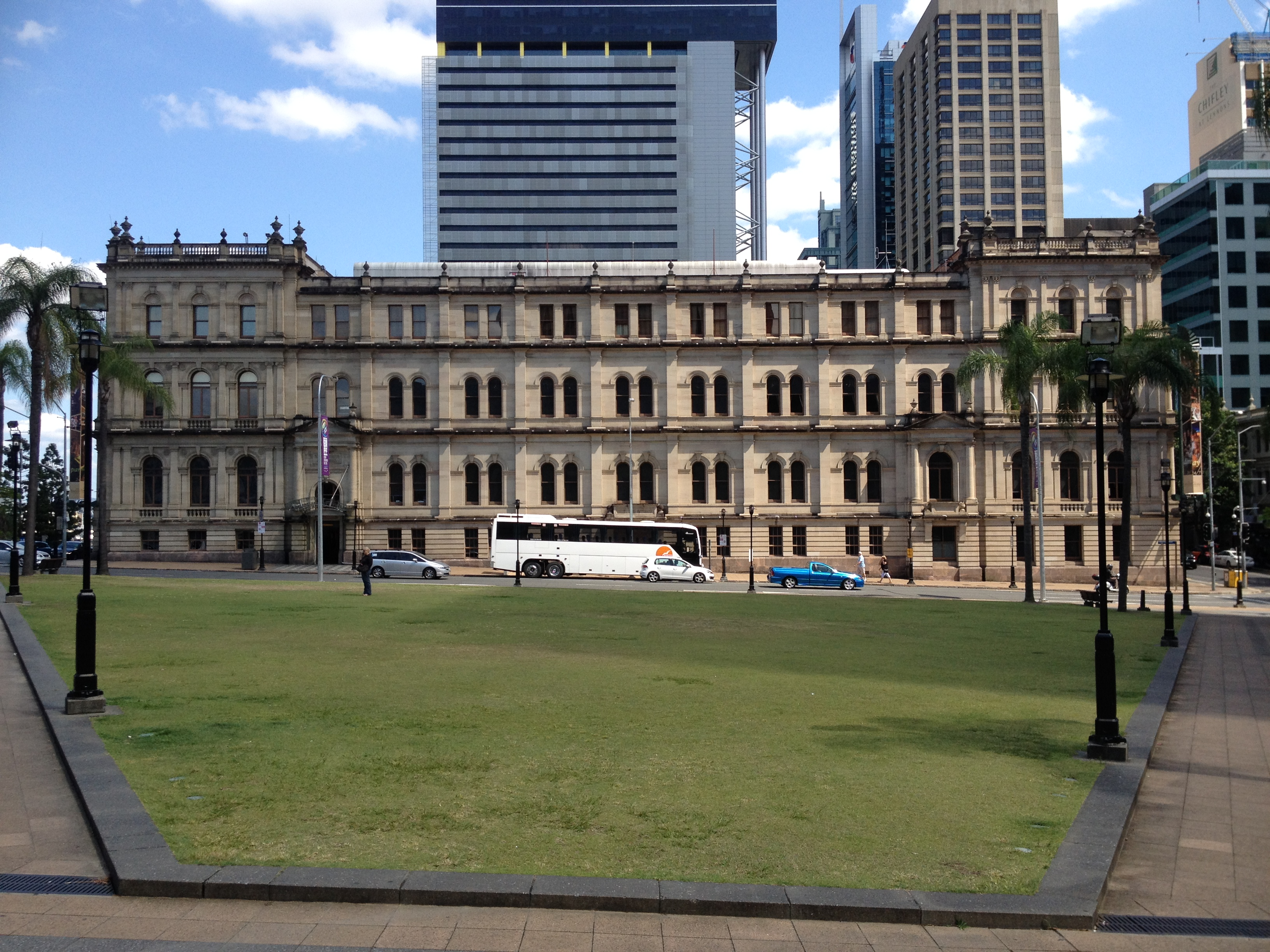
Elizabeth Street facade completed in the 2nd stage, 2013

The first and second phases of construction employ a fire protection system in parts of the building. Vaulted coke concrete floors are supported on concrete encased wrought iron joists and bearers. Beams are supported at walls by engaged piers or on freestanding concrete encased cast iron columns. Steel roller shutters slide down to protect openings. The structure of the third phase of the building consists of reinforced concrete slabs supported on loadbearing masonry columns and steel girders. The roofs of the earlier sections are hipped corrugated iron, easily distinguished from the roof of the third stage which is a flat reinforced concrete slab protected by a bituminous membrane.

The building has several entrances. The main entry is located centrally on the Queen Street facade where a wide flight of stairs leading to three sets of timber-framed glass double doors in arched doorways gives access to a foyer on the ground floor level. The foyer has a coffered plaster ceiling and strongly patterned floor. A pair of Ionic columns opposite the entrance frame the central flight of the symmetrically designed grand staircase. This staircase, part of the third phase of construction, is made of reinforced concrete rather than the cast iron stringers with slate treads that were used on the earlier staircases. The staircase is lit with Palladian motif windows opening onto the courtyard.

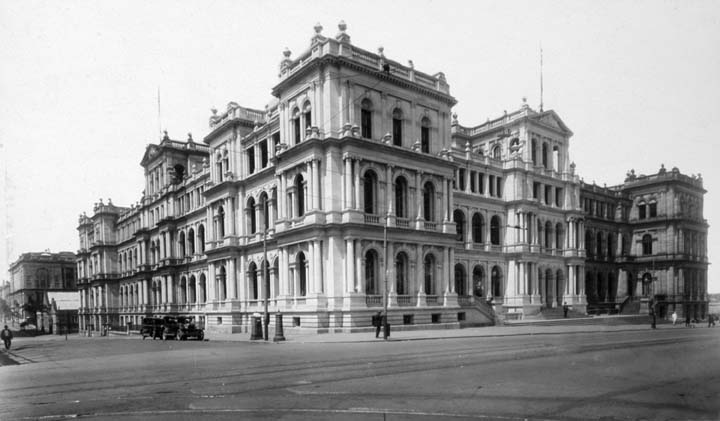
George Street and Queen Street facades completed in stage 3, 1928

Wide continuous hallways connect all rooms on each level while vertical circulation is via generous staircases located along the hallway. With the exception of the grand staircase, stairwells are top lit by delicate timber framed glass lanterns. All staircases feature timber handrails, ornamental cast iron balustrades and stair landings that are contrasted with the treads by the use of bold geometric patterning. Some of the original staircases have been removed. Rooms open off the hallways on both sides and are lit either from the street or via the courtyard. Cast-iron balconies run around the courtyard on every level. Rooms facing the courtyard have french doors opening onto these balconies. Two wings containing toilets and washrooms project into the courtyard space. The building has restrained rendered and painted interiors that feature cedar joinery and ornamental plasterwork. The level of ornateness varies according to the importance of the room. Rooms in the William Street wing have decorative cast-iron wall ventilators, marble fireplaces and plaster ceiling roses. The Cabinet room, positioned in the centre of this wing on the piano nobile, is distinguished by a more embellished plaster ceiling and elaborate carved cedar panels over the doorways. Ministers' suites, located in the corner pavilions, and rooms associated with the Cabinet overlook the street. These rooms have french doors opening onto arcades and connecting doors and private corridors so that circulation between ministerial spaces is possible without encountering the public.

A contemporary 1920s interior was achieved in the third phase of the building by infilling between loadbearing columns with semi-demountable partitions. These partitions consist of a timber stud frame with asbestos cement panelling below head height and patterned glass above.

The exterior of the building is highly intact while the interior has had only minor modifications.

== Treasury Casino ==
The courtyard at the centre of the building was roofed over for the conversion. From 1995 to 2024 the refurbished building housed the Conrad Treasury Casino, contrasting the once political orientation of the building to one full of entertainment. During this time it was home to two bars, five restaurants, and eight function rooms.

== Heritage listing ==
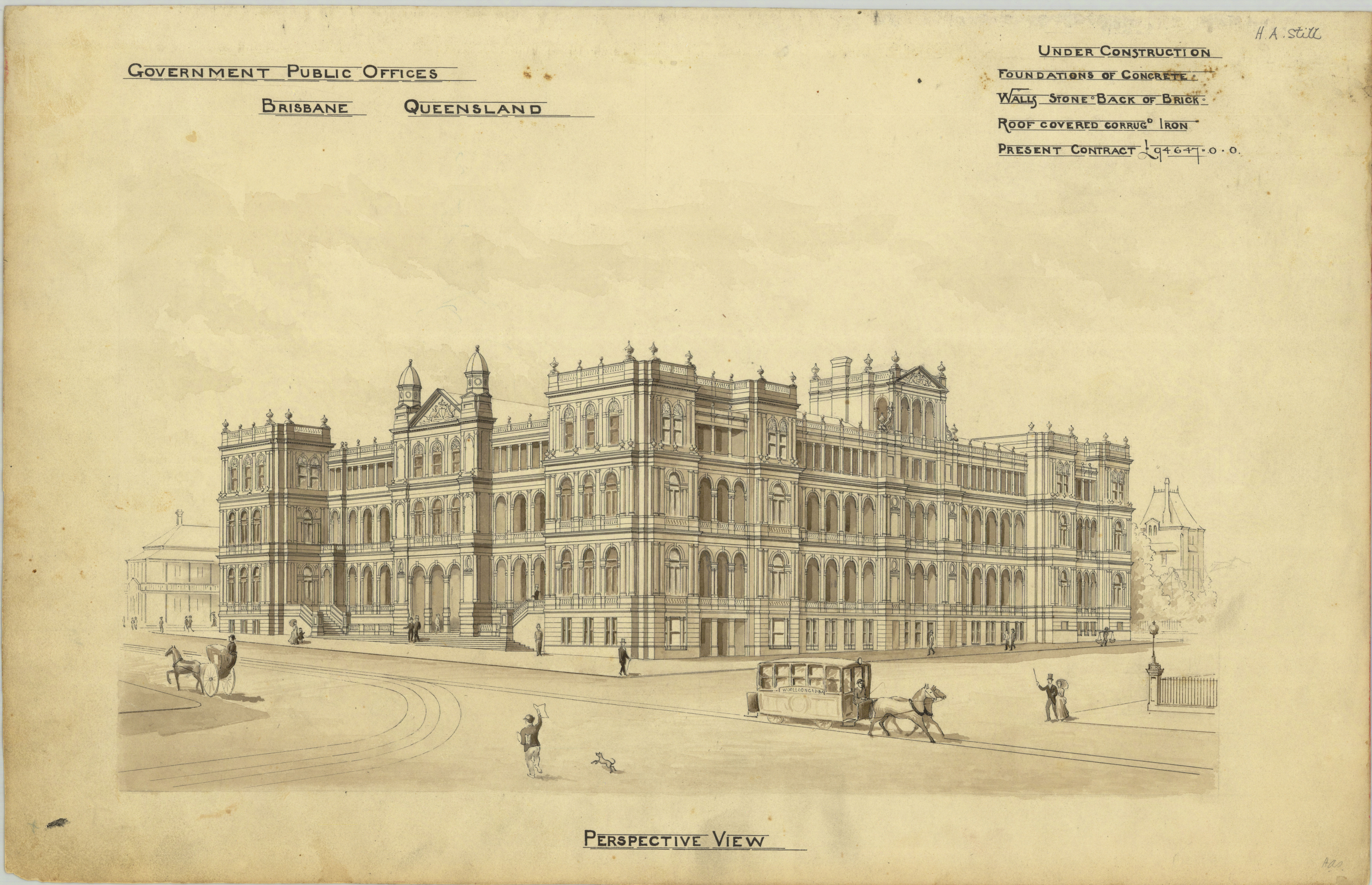
Perspective view (Queen Street to the left, William Street to the right), circa 1888

Treasury Building was listed on the Queensland Heritage Register on 21 October 1992 having satisfied the following criteria.

The place is important in demonstrating the evolution or pattern of Queensland's history.

The Treasury Building is important in demonstrating the evolution and pattern of Queensland's history being a visual expression of Queensland aspiration and pride in the rapid progress of the colony since 1859. The building is prominent physical evidence of Queensland's rapid economic growth and associated government confidence and enterprise in the 1880s. The physical intactness of the building, particularly in the interior spaces, demonstrates the working of Queensland executive and administration government in the late nineteenth century.

The place demonstrates rare, uncommon or endangered aspects of Queensland's cultural heritage.

As an intact late nineteenth century building, whose continuity of design has been preserved over three stages, the Treasury Building demonstrates a rare aspect of Queensland's cultural heritage.

The place is important in demonstrating the principal characteristics of a particular class of cultural places.

The Treasury Building is important in demonstrating the principal characteristics of Italian Renaissance style in late nineteenth-century Australian public buildings, and is an outstanding example of its type.

The place is important because of its aesthetic significance.

The building is important in exhibiting particular aesthetic characteristics valued by the community, and by architectural historians in particular, namely the accomplished design, detailing, materials and workmanship and its landmark quality and townscape contribution, particularly in relation to the adjacent buildings and sites and to the river.

The place is important in demonstrating a high degree of creative or technical achievement at a particular period.

The Treasury Building is important in demonstrating a high degree of creative achievement, being a major work by foremost Australian architect JJ Clark.

The place has a strong or special association with a particular community or cultural group for social, cultural or spiritual reasons.

The Treasury Building has a strong and special association with the role and prestige of government, being a renowned symbol of accountable self-government in Queensland for over a century, and an integral member of the most prominent, important and cohesive group of government buildings in Queensland.

The place has a special association with the life or work of a particular person, group or organisation of importance in Queensland's history.

Both site and building have had a special association with authority, government and administration in Queensland since 1825.

== See also ==
- History of Brisbane
- Australian non-residential architectural styles
