= North Bank, Brisbane =

Proposed development in Brisbane

Coordinates: 27°28′20.4″S 153°01′20.84″E

North Bank was a proposed commercial development in the Brisbane River in the centre of Brisbane, Queensland, Australia in 2007. The site to be built on started from William Jolly Bridge and stretched to Goodwill Bridge at Gardens Point. There was minimal public support for the proposal and it did not proceed.

== Project plan ==
The proposed Multiplex design for North Bank (opposite South Bank) contained eight skyscrapers for office space and residential use, with the highest building being 46 stories. It also contained a pedestrian bridge, 'open spaces', riverfront promenade and an olympic-sized public swimming pool. The proposal entailed the government allowing Multiplex to build out as far as 90 metres into the Brisbane River.

== Opposition to the proposal ==
There was minimal support outside of government and Multiplex offices for this development, and opposition has come from the public as well as Queensland's peak body of town planners, a major group of architects, and an award-winning University of Queensland Associate Professor Peter Skinner. Despite its initial approval by the Bligh Labor government there is currently much debate regarding the value of the project, given the extensive ecological, visual, physical and infrastructure consequence involved in building so far out over the river.

There was much opposition to the proposal, with most parties concerned about the architectural, historical and ecological legacy of the development. The Brisbane City Council and the Queensland State Government are not the developers of the site, but are vested interested parties as North Bank is a private developer's proposal. There was a very limited and under-publicised public consultation period undertaken after the project was first announced. The National Trust Queensland has condemned the proposal as an inappropriate use of an historic precinct. Federal Environment Minister Peter Garrett also spoke out against the project.

The Sunday Mail on 20 October 2010 reported that commercial elements of the North Bank development had been scrapped and a much simpler project will go forward that improves public access for pedestrians and cyclists under the existing riverside expressway. On 30 May 2012, the new Queensland Premier Campbell Newman announced plans for a slightly downsized North Bank with some government offices and a boardwalk.

== See also ==
- North Quay
