= Coronation Drive retaining wall =

Historic embankment in Brisbane, Queensland

Coronation Drive Retaining Wall
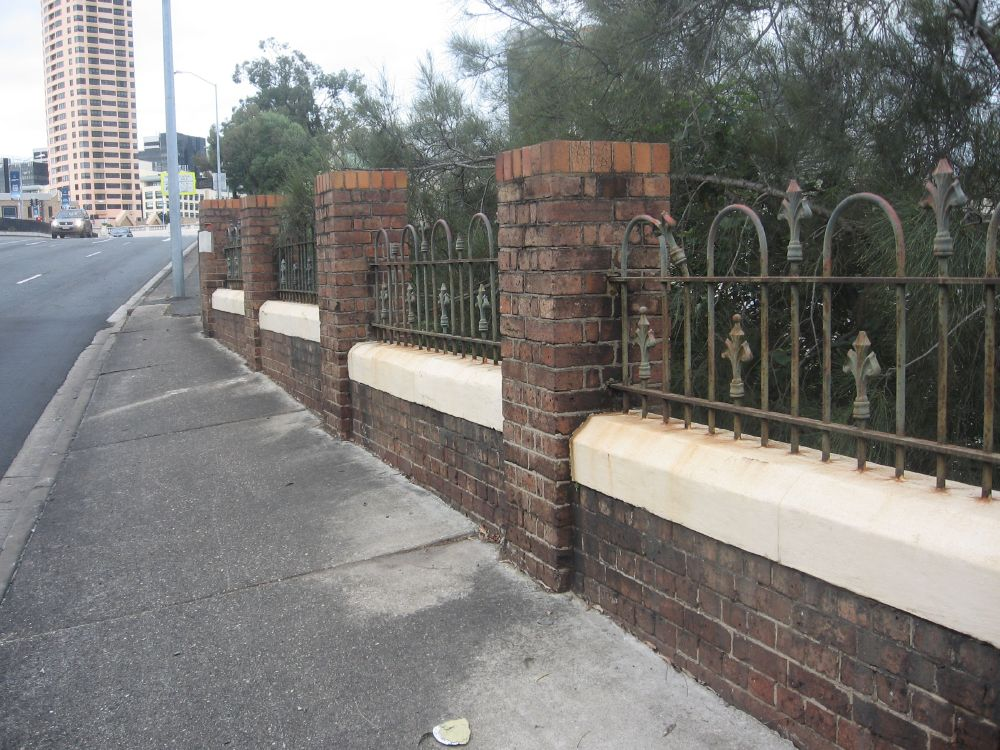
- Coronation Drive retaining wall, from Coronation Drive, 2008

- Location within Queensland Location within Australia
- 27.4682°S 153.0133°E
- Location: Coronation Drive, Brisbane City, City of Brisbane, Queensland, Australia

History
- Design period: 1870s–1890s (late 19th century)
- Built: 1887

Site notes
- Architect: Thomas Kirk

Queensland Heritage Register
- Official name: Coronation Drive (North Quay) Retaining Wall
- Type: state heritage (built)
- Designated: 21 October 1992
- Reference no.: 600134
- Significant period: 1880s (fabric)
- Significant components: fencing, wall/s – retaining
- Builders: George E Willcocks

Coronation Drive Retaining Wall is a heritage-listed embankment at Coronation Drive, Brisbane City, City of Brisbane, Queensland, Australia. It was formerly known as the North Quay retaining wall. It was designed by Thomas Kirk and built in 1887 by George Charles Willcocks. It was added to the Queensland Heritage Register on 21 October 1992.

== History ==
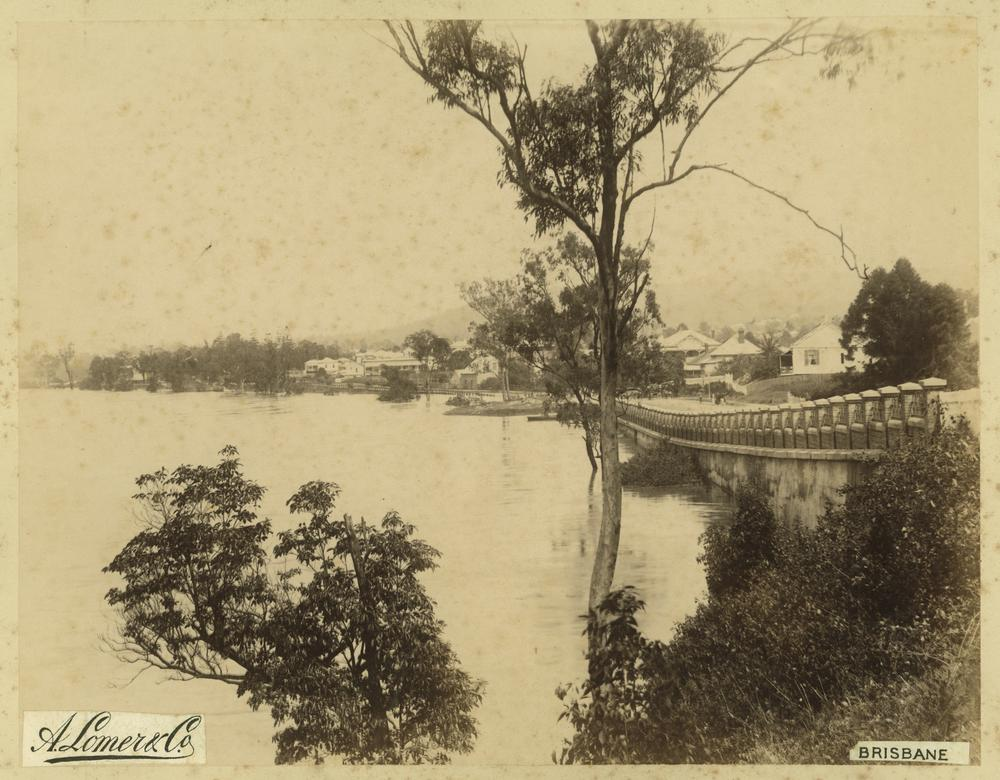
Retaining wall on the River Road at North Quay, Brisbane, 1889

In late January 1887 Brisbane experienced severe storms which resulted in flash flooding and damage throughout the city. A couple of weeks after the floods, sections of the river bank and road along North Quay fell into the Brisbane River. An existing embankment and "dry stone wall" had been undercut and collapsed. The Brisbane Municipal Council was advised by their Chief Engineer, Thomas Kirk, of several options for dealing with the problem. The council decided on the most permanent solution - to construct a mass concrete retaining wall at an approximate cost of £13,000.

Kirk's choice of concrete rather than masonry work was quite adventurous, as mass concrete technology was new to Australia. Kirk prepared the designs and the contract was awarded to George Charles Willcocks. Work began in May and the actual construction time was shorter than even Willcocks' optimistic estimate - the road was opened four months later. One of the most challenging tasks in the construction involved massive excavations, the deepest being for a huge coffer dam which kept the river waters out of the site. The men preparing the foundations many feet below the low tide mark worked behind this dam with the full force of the water bearing on the other side.

G Charles Willcocks had been involved in railway construction in South Africa in the early 1880s. After hearing of the Queensland government's plan to borrow £10,000,000 for an expanded railway construction programme, he migrated to Australia in 1885. In 1886, he began a long career in municipal and government works by winning a contract for building a storm water drainage system in South Brisbane and Kangaroo Point. Other public works followed - Stratton Drain, the Ann Street wall, the North Quay (now Coronation Drive) wall, extensive railway works in southern Queensland and northern New South Wales and the wood blocking of Queen and George Streets.

The stone cappings which were on the piers have been replaced with bricks. A section of the western end of the wall was moved in 1983.

== Description ==
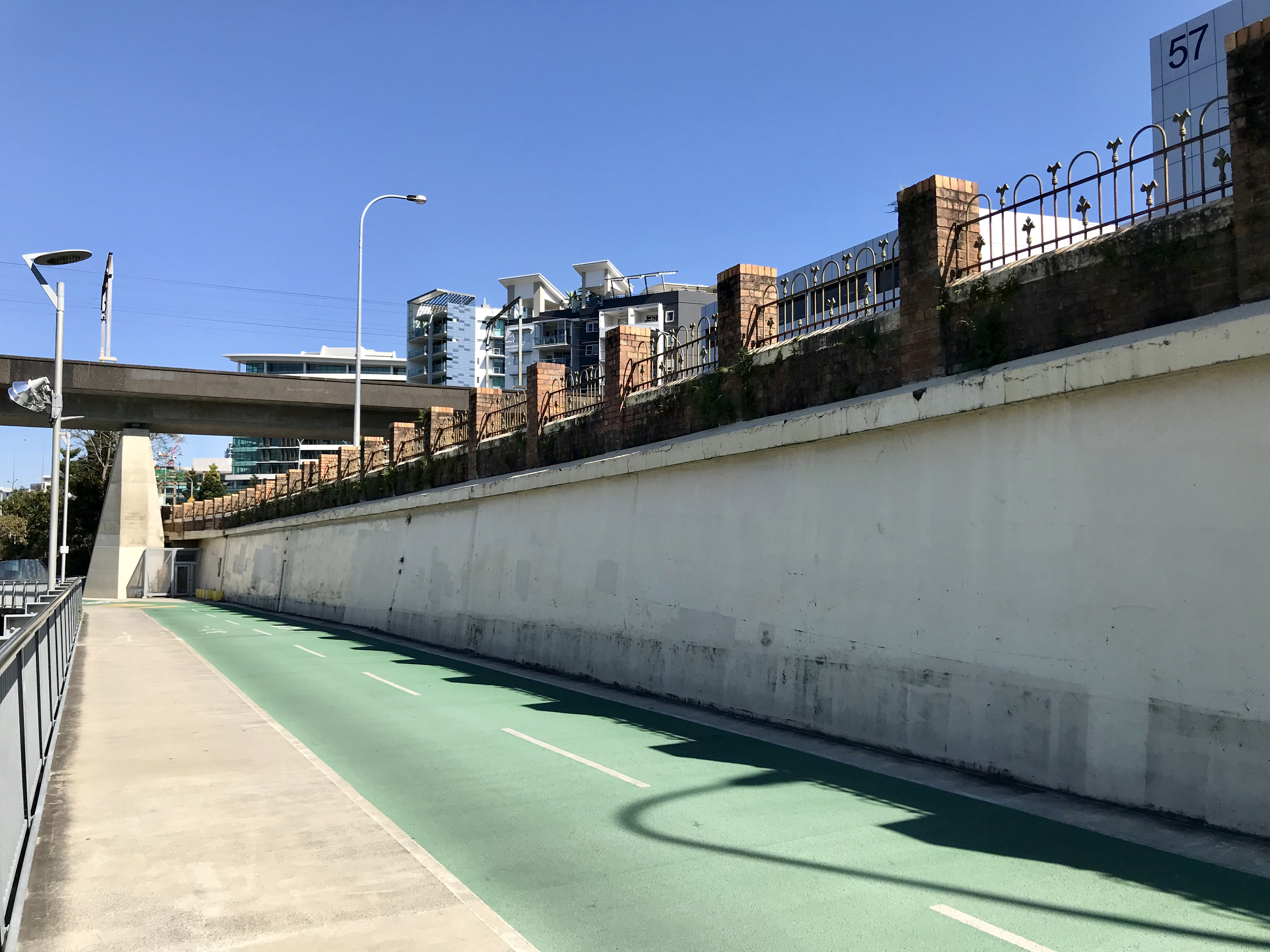
Retaining wall, as seen from the bikepath in 2018

A mass concrete wall topped by a brick parapet wall and wrought iron railing which extends for a length of about 200 metres (660 ft) along the northern river bank between Boomerang Street and Eagle Terrace. It is built into bedrock at depths varying from 3 to 8 metres (9.8 to 26.2 ft). The wall, which is almost 1 metre (3 ft 3 in) thick at ground level extends by a series of gradations to thicknesses between 1.2 and 2.4 metres (3 ft 11 in and 7 ft 10 in) at the base. The view of the wall from the road reveals only the brick piers and decorative wrought iron railings of the parapet wall. At either end of the wall are marble plaques inscribed with the words "James Hipwood Mayor 1887". Beneath the parapet wall the concrete retaining wall is visible from the bike path and from the river.

== Heritage listing ==
The Coronation Drive retaining wall was listed on the Queensland Heritage Register on 21 October 1992 having satisfied the following criteria.

The place is important in demonstrating the evolution or pattern of Queensland's history.

Constructed in 1887, the Coronation Drive retaining wall is as an early example in Queensland of mass concrete technology and is a major engineering achievement of the period.

The place is important in demonstrating the principal characteristics of a particular class of cultural places.

Constructed in 1887, the Coronation Drive retaining wall is as an early example in Queensland of mass concrete technology and is a major engineering achievement of the period.

The place is important in demonstrating a high degree of creative or technical achievement at a particular period.

Constructed in 1887, the Coronation Drive retaining wall is as an early example in Queensland of mass concrete technology and is a major engineering achievement of the period.

The place has a special association with the life or work of a particular person, group or organisation of importance in Queensland's history.

The retaining wall is as an example of the work of George Charles Willcocks, a contractor who was responsible for a number of large public projects.

== See also ==
- William Street retaining wall
