= Coronation Drive =

Road in Brisbane, Queensland, Australia

Coronation Drive Queensland
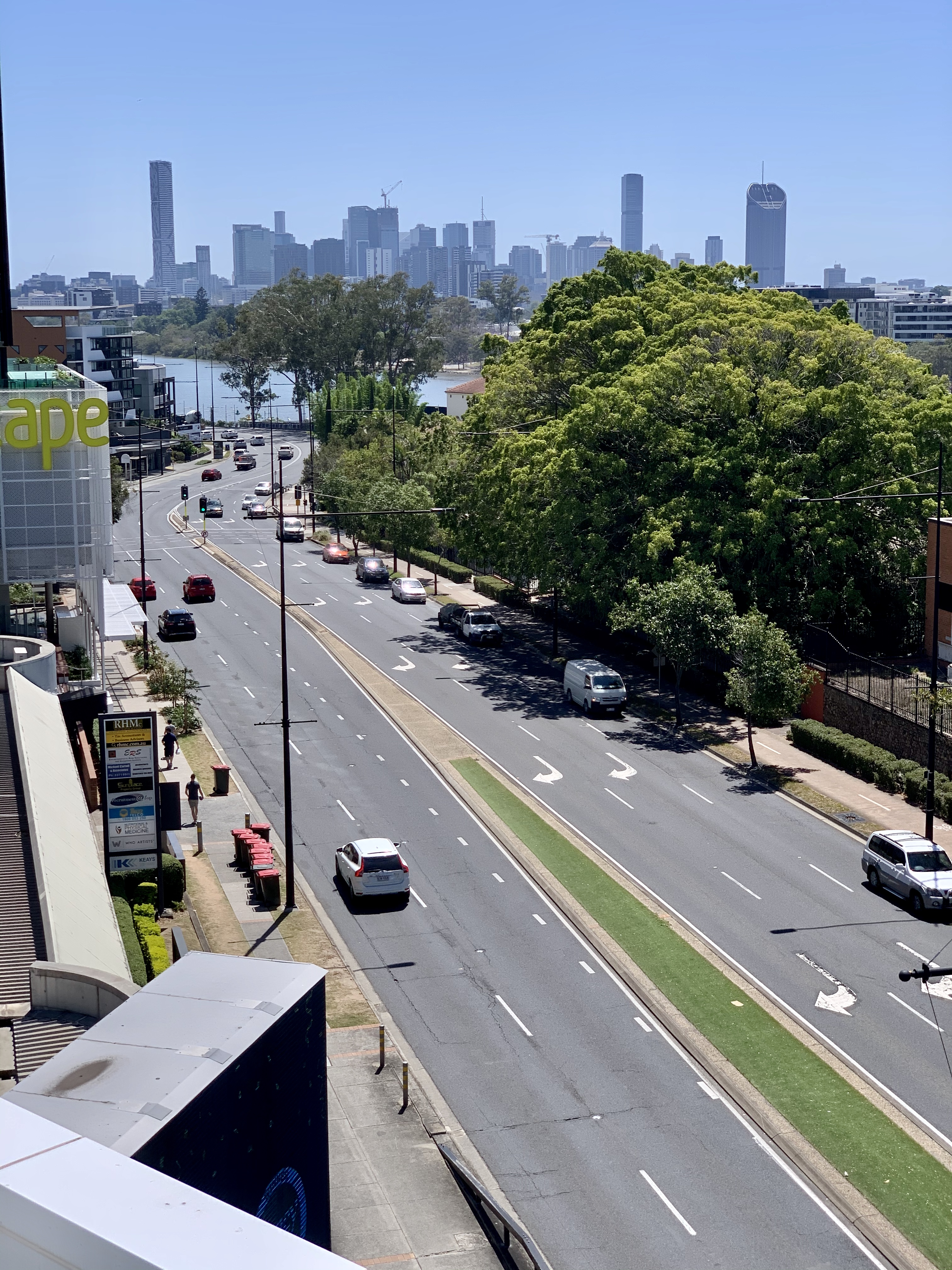
- Coronation Drive and Brisbane CBD viewed from Toowong Village in November 2019

General information
- Type: Road
- Length: 3.1 km (1.9 mi)
- Route number(s): State Route 33

Major junctions
- Northeast end: Pacific Motorway (M3), Brisbane
- Southwest end: Benson Street to High Street / Moggill Road (State Route 33), Toowong

Location(s)
- Major suburbs: Milton

Coronation Drive, popularly known as Coro Drive, is a road in Brisbane, Queensland, which connects the central business district with the suburb of Toowong. It begins at the northern end of the Riverside Expressway and follows the Brisbane River through the suburbs of Milton and Auchenflower until it terminates in Toowong at Benson Road and High Street.

Coronation Drive is six lanes wide for the majority of its length, with the Bicentennial Bike Path also for pedestrian and bicycle traffic. The road is one of the busiest in Brisbane, carrying an average of 75,560 vehicles per day between July and December 2014.

== History ==
Coronation Drive started out as a rough track that developed along the river during the 1840s. It was initially called Moggill Road (because it was the road to Moggill), then later (1870s) it became known as the River Road. In 1937 the River Road was renamed Coronation Drive in honour of the coronation of King George VI, a suggestion made by Archbishop James Duhig. On 13 May 1937, the Governor of Queensland Sir Leslie Wilson planted a small bunya tree on North Quay, Brisbane to mark the name change. Brisbane Lord Mayor John Beals Chandler undertook the improvement and beautification of the road in order to fulfill his vision of a gracious city.

Coronation Drive developed as the major transport route for the western suburbs along with Milton Road. A landslide caused by flood waters in 1974 closed Coronation Drive due to cracking and subsidence. The flood caused the redirection of Coronation Drive so that traffic inbound to Brisbane City turned left at the Sylvan Road intersection, and then right down Land Street. This diversion remained in place for nearly 30 years.

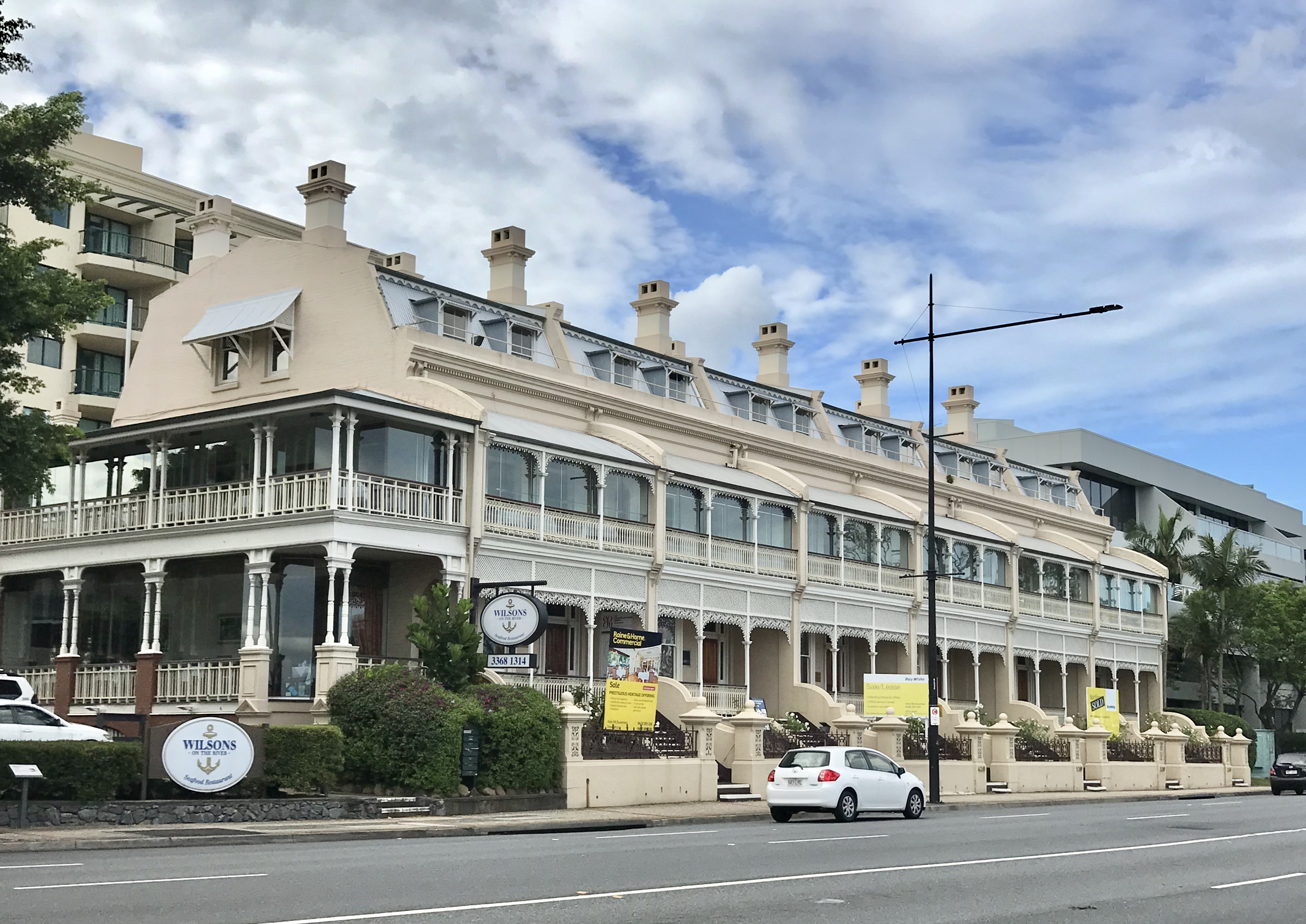
Heritage listed Cook Terrace on Coronation Drive at Milton

In 2004 Coronation Drive was completely redeveloped into its current day form, with the redirection removed and widening to allow 6 lanes of traffic. Former Lord Mayor Jim Soorley inaugurated a series of "tidal flow" traffic lights in both directions, as well as a dedicated bus lane, in order to ease congestion along the road. Upon the election of Campbell Newman, the bus lanes were changed to T3 Transit Lanes with three occupants required. In March 2007 the T3 transit lane restrictions were removed after Campbell Newman requested the change based on analysis showing that only 5% of vehicles actually use the T3 lane. The Labor opposition did not block the change.

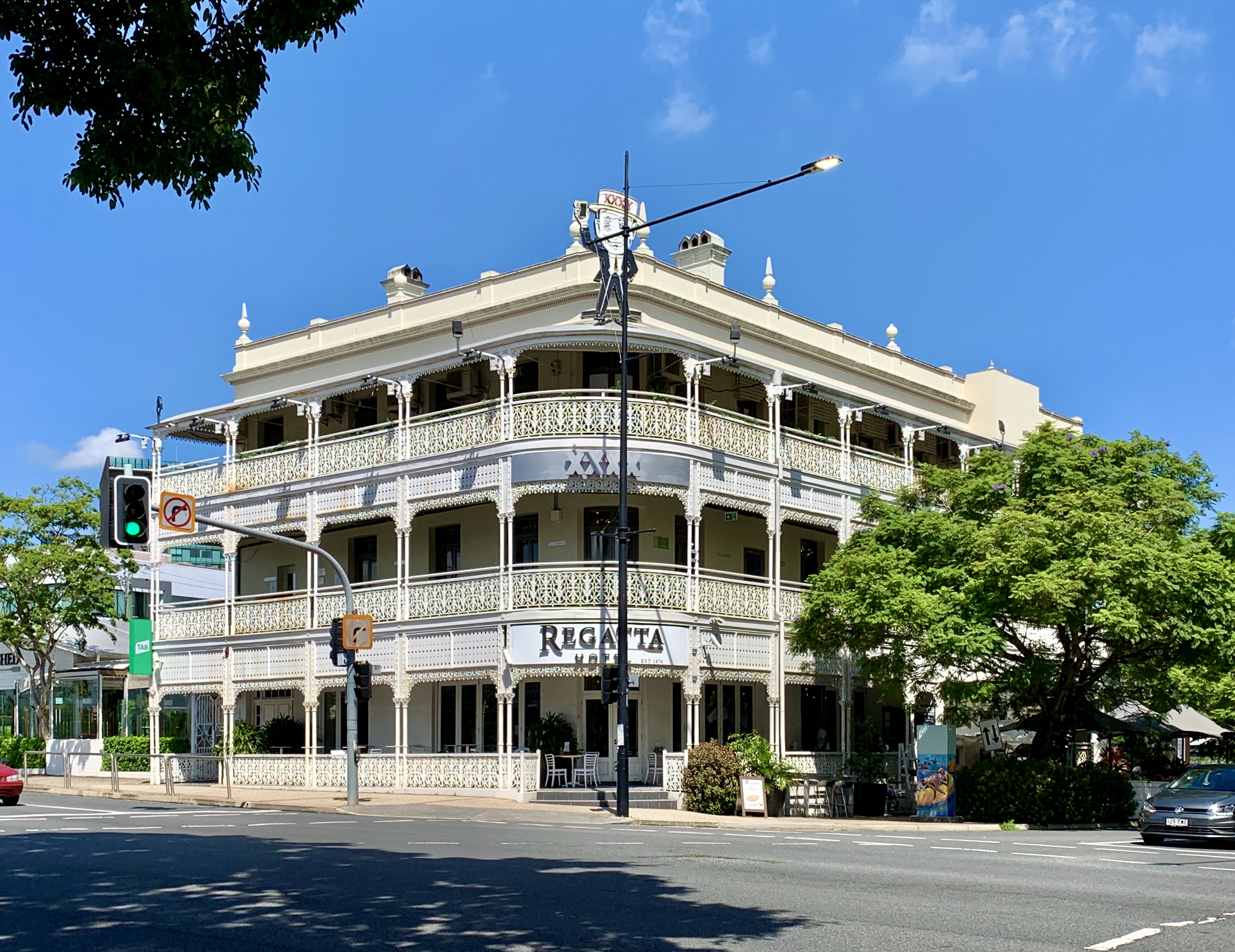
The Regatta Hotel in February 2020

In September 2008, the Council announced a decision to scrap the Tidal Flow System after conceding it as a failure. This decision was influenced by the construction of the Hale Street Bridge and also the maintenance cost of the system, amounting to $600,000 each year, with a further $7 million in repairs. Instead, 3 permanent lanes will be inbound to the city and 2 lanes outbound. Statistics show that more traffic travels inbound than outbound at both morning and afternoon peak hours. One of the inbound lanes will be made into a T2 lane once the Hale Street Bridge project is well developed.

== Tidal Flow System ==
The Coronation Drive Tidal Flow System was implemented in 2002 to improve traffic flow along the routinely congested road. It consisted of overhead gantries displaying white arrows or red crosses to indicate which lanes can be driven in, LED signs on approach that indicated current lanes open, LED catseye markers embedded in the road that were turned on and off to move the median line and boom gates that would swing into the lanes when closed to stop use of the closed lane.

The Tidal Flow System was heavily criticised by the public for a number of reasons. These included the perception that the lane system was confusing and caused road accidents, especially when drivers were required to make turns on or off the tidal flow system. Lights in the road meant to guide drivers were often broken and during daylight hours were hard to discern. In particular, the right hand turn from Coronation Drive onto Lang Street (outbound) has two lanes and drivers were routinely confused as to which lane on Lang street they should turn into.

The Tidal Flow System was well over budget, with the cost of the system far higher than originally planned. The system was prone to vandalism, in particular the boom gates used to block off lanes were routinely hit by vehicles. Critics claimed that the tidal flow system had not been effective in improving traffic flow. The primary reason given is due to traffic in both directions being high at peak hour due to the University of Queensland bound traffic balancing the city bound traffic. The tidal flow system did not close lanes due to traffic accidents or roadworks, instead, traditional vehicles and signage were used, leaving a much touted feature of the system unutilised. Out of state or overseas drivers tended to not understand the system and its dynamic lanes, thus were likely to end up driving in T3/Bus lanes or not merging when they should.

The Tidal Flow System was dismantled and removed at the end of 2008 after a decision by the Brisbane City Council. A similar system was operated on the Houghton Highway across Bramble Bay at Redcliffe until the opening of the Ted Smout Memorial Bridge in 2011.

== Major intersections and landmarks ==
- Grey Street / William Jolly Bridge
  - Coronation Drive: Coronation Drive retaining wall
- Boomerang Street / Go Between Bridge
- Cribb Street
  - 249 Coronation Drive: Cook Terrace
- Park Road
- Graham Street
- Lang Parade
- Chasely Street
  - 451 Coronation Drive: Moorlands
- Land Street
- Sylvan Road
  - 543 Coronation Drive: Regatta Hotel
  - 579–583 Coronation Drive: former Toowong Municipal Library Building
  - 600 Coronation Drive: Middenbury House
- Benson Street

The entire road is in the Brisbane local government area.

Location	km	mi	Destinations	Notes
Brisbane City	0	0.0	Riverside Expressway – south	Eastern end of the Coronation Drive (State Route 33) road continues as the Riverside Expressway (M3) to – Pacific Motorway, Gold Coast
Brisbane City	0.1	0.062	Grey Street (State Route 10) – William Jolly Bridge	Eastbound exit only
Milton–Brisbane City boundary	0.5	0.31	Hale Street – north – Inner City Bypass (M3) / south – Go Between Bridge	No westbound access to Go Between Bridge
Milton	1.3	0.81	Park Road	No right turn from Park Road
Auchenflower	2.3	1.4	Land Street	No right turn from Land Street
Toowong	2.7	1.7	Sylvan Street	
Toowong	3.1	1.9	Benson Street	Western end of the Coronation Drive (State Route 33)
1.000 mi = 1.609 km; 1.000 km = 0.621 mi
