= William Jolly Bridge =

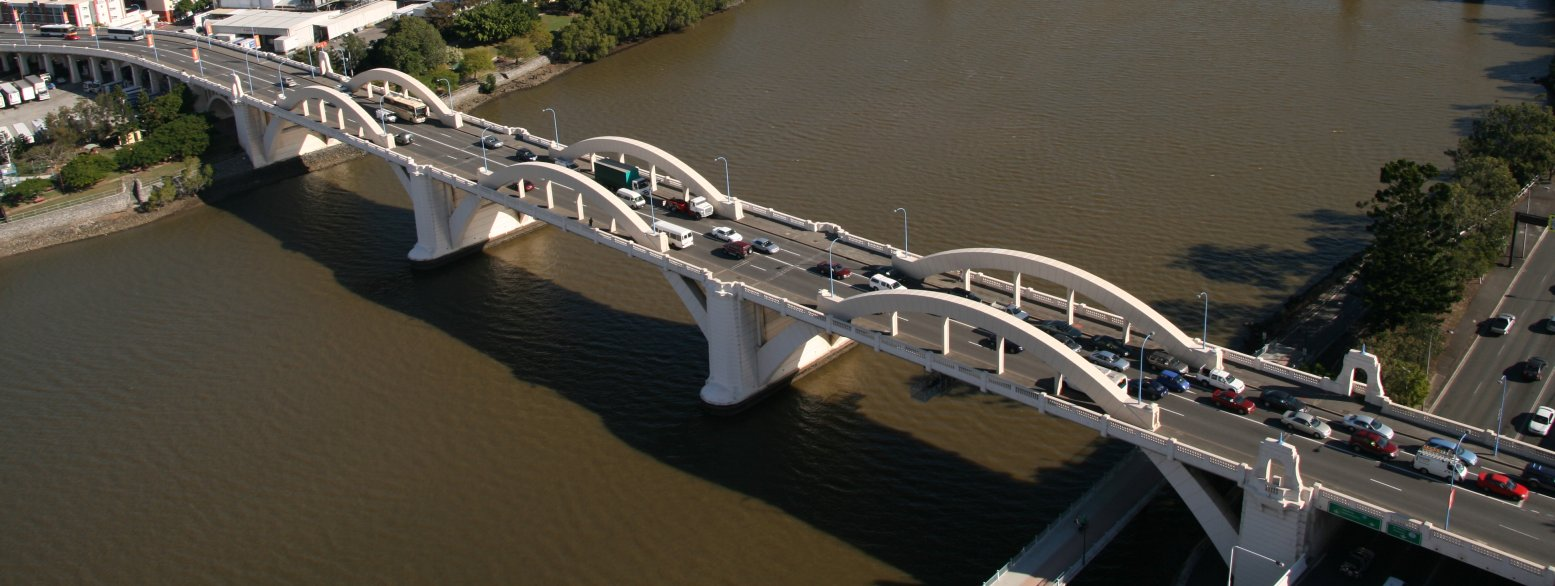
- Coordinates: 27.46845°S 153.015491°E
- Carries: 4 lanes of vehicular traffic, two pedestrian paths
- Crosses: Brisbane River
- Locale: Brisbane, Queensland, Australia
- Named for: William Jolly

Characteristics
- Design: Steel frame arch bridge
- Total length: 1,634 ft (498 m)
- Longest span: 3 x 238 ft (72.5 m)

History
- Construction cost: £688,387
- Opened: 30 March 1932; 94 years ago

Location
- Interactive map of William Jolly Bridge

William Jolly Bridge
- Location within Queensland
- 27.4694°S 153.0159°E
- Location: Grey Street, Brisbane City, Queensland, Australia

History
- Design period: 1919–1930s (interwar period)
- Built: 1928–1932

Site notes
- Architect: Harding Frew

Queensland Heritage Register
- Official name: William Jolly Bridge, Grey Street Bridge
- Type: state heritage (built)
- Designated: 6 August 1996
- Reference no.: 601694
- Significant period: 1920s, 1930s (fabric)
- Significant components: pier/s (bridge), sculpture, wall/s – retaining, abutments – road bridge
- Builders: MR Hornibrook

The William Jolly Bridge is a heritage-listed road bridge over the Brisbane River between North Quay in the Brisbane central business district and Grey Street in South Brisbane, within City of Brisbane, Queensland, Australia. It was designed by Harding Frew and built from 1928 to 1932 by MR Hornibrook.

The style of the bridge's design is Art Deco, which was popular at the time. MR Hornibrook company built the bridge that consists of two piers that were built in the river and two pylons on the river banks, which support three graceful arches. The rainbow arch type, as it was described, was claimed to be the first of its type in Australia. It is a steel frame arch bridge with an unusual concrete veneer, treated to make it appear like "light-coloured porphyry".

When opened, during the worst year of the Great Depression, the bridge was known simply as the Grey Street Bridge. It was renamed to the William Jolly Bridge on 5 July 1955 in memory of William Jolly, the first Lord Mayor of Greater Brisbane. It was added to the Queensland Heritage Register on 6 August 1996.

== History ==
The William Jolly Bridge was constructed between 1928 and 1932 following the formation of Greater Brisbane in 1925, and was one of the first major capital works of the new Brisbane City Council and bears the name of its first Mayor, William Jolly. At the time of construction, the only traffic bridge linking the Brisbane central business district and South Brisbane was the second Victoria Bridge, built in 1897 to replace an earlier bridge washed away in the flood of 1893. The William Jolly Bridge crosses the Brisbane River at the tip of the South Brisbane peninsula between Grey Street, South Brisbane, and at North Quay at the intersection of Skew and Saul Streets on the northern bank.

The tip of the South Brisbane peninsula is traditionally a point of crossing. A sandy beach marked the point of crossing for aboriginal tribes from the Moreton region, then later for Europeans who crossed the river near this point on the North Quay ferry, and then from the 1930s via the William Jolly Bridge. On the south bank, aboriginal and later European pathways and land use patterns formed the basis for subsequent traffic networks.

Prior to European settlement, the whole of the South Brisbane peninsula was known as Kurilpa, meaning the place of rats, due to the large number of bush rats to be found in the lush vegetation of the area. (The riverfront park adjacent to the bridge at South Brisbane is now called Kurilpa Point.). The first European use of the south bank occurred soon after the establishment of the Moreton Bay penal settlement in 1825 when convicts cleared the flats across the river in order to grow grain to feed the settlement. In 1830 the cultivation of the flats on the south bank was ordered to cease by the Commandant; however throughout the 1830s timber was being exported to Sydney from the south bank. Those en route to the outstations at Coopers Plains, Limestone Hill and Cleveland crossed the area.

On 10 February 1842, following the closure of the penal settlement, the Moreton Bay district was declared open for free settlement. As the point of entry and exit, South Brisbane prospered in the 1840s. In 1846 Brisbane was brought within the provisions of the Police Towns Act of 1839, and boundaries to the town were set.

The first ferry to convey passengers, horses and carriages began operation from Russell Street c. 1842. For over 30 years this was the only vehicular ferry crossing to North Brisbane (as the Brisbane CBD was then known) in this area, except for a brief period from June 1865-November 1867 when a temporary timber bridge, which was rapidly destroyed by marine borer, spanned the river.

Brisbane's first burial ground had been established on the northern bank where Skew Street is now located, (later moved to Hale Street where it became known as Paddington Cemetery, site now partially occupied by Suncorp Stadium), and to the rear of the burial ground a new gaol was established by 1860 and military barracks in 1864. Farming was established along the banks of the river, and development concentrated on Petrie Terrace. Land between the new burial ground and barracks was put up for auction in 1861, and from 1863 the auctioning of suburban allotments (now Paddington) encouraged the spread of the settlement along the ridges.

The North Quay Ferry, a row boat, crossed the river where the bridge now stands, and the River Road (now Coronation Drive) was established as a track which serviced properties towards Toowong. The extension on the Main Line railway from Ipswich to Brisbane in 1875 isolated the strip of riverfront residences from the working-class houses in Milton and Paddington, and this contributed to the relative lack of development along the northern bank of the Milton Reach of the river in subsequent years.

The opening of the Victoria Bridge on 15 June 1874 provided an important transport and communications link between the north and south banks of the river, and provided further impetus to the development of the south bank. The Victoria Bridge was funded by the Brisbane Municipal Council and a toll was imposed to recover costs. Eventually, responsibility for the bridge was taken over by the Queensland Government.

In the 1880s, the south bank experienced a development boom. The South Brisbane dry dock was opened in 1881, coal wharves at Woolloongabba and associated rail links were established c.1885, and South Brisbane railway station was established as the passenger terminus for suburban and country lines built during the 1880s. Industry and commerce was attracted to the area, and Stanley Street developed into a major retail centre and thoroughfare. The spread of housing included the development of large residences located along the ridges with views of the river, and industry developed along the southern bank of the Milton Reach.

The establishment of the South Brisbane municipality occurred on 7 January 1888. The development of the civic centre focused on the Stanley and Vulture Street intersection, with the construction of the South Brisbane Town Hall, Fire Station, Post Office and South Brisbane railway station. The boom of the 1880s collapsed, followed by maritime and pastoral strikes in the early 1890s, and the collapse of banks in 1893. Land and rent values plummeted to their lowest levels and hundreds of home owners applied to the council to work out their rates. A series of floods of the Brisbane River in 1893 resulted in the collapse of the Albert rail bridge at Indooroopilly in 1893, which diverted all rail traffic to South Brisbane, and the collapse of Victoria Bridge on 6 February 1893 which cut vital transport and communications links with the central city. A report in the Telegraph on 8 February 1893 described the event as:

"What a terrible hiatus in the course of business alone has been caused by the collapse of Victoria Bridge. Once again, for practical purposes, the metropolis is divided into two separate towns. No bridge, no telephone, no telegraph, and vastly inadequate ferry accommodation."

Urban expansion on both sides of the river continued with the opening of the new Victoria Bridge in 1897 and the advent of electric trams. The first encroachment of industry into the residential enclave along the high northern embankment occurred above the North Quay ferry terminal in 1897 with the construction of the Helidon Spa Company's extensive works from the North Quay–River Road intersection. The residential enclave was further reduced when the Morrow-Rankin (later Arnott's Biscuits) factory was established upstream from the Helidon Spa works in 1913.

On 3 October 1903, the Queensland Government gazetted the proclamation which constituted the City of South Brisbane. From 1908 the South Brisbane City Council tried to bring all the wharves in the South Brisbane Reach under its control and encouraged further commercial and industrial development along the river front. As finance permitted, provision of services such as gas, electricity, road sealing, water supply and an adequate system of drainage and sanitation improved the living and working conditions in the area and generated a demand for residential accommodation and improved cross-river communication.

In the immediate period after World War I, residential growth created continued demand for public transport, particularly through and from the South Brisbane peninsula. Land resumption for road widening was enacted in both Stanley and Melbourne Streets, and in September 1925, South Brisbane City Council is noted as having a population of 40,000 persons. In 1930 the completion of the Sydney to South Brisbane interstate railway benefited the local economy with a demand for factory and manufacturing sites. Health factors, noise and nuisance associated with industry and proximity to wharves and docks all contributed to the changing perception of the area bounded by Grey and Boundary Streets, Montague Road and the river. As a result, when the time came to resume land in connection with the construction of the Grey Street Bridge, there was scant opposition.

The Grey Street Bridge was conceived as a bypass for motor traffic between the southern suburbs and western suburbs of Brisbane to avoid increasing traffic congestion on the Victoria Bridge and on CBD streets such as George Street.

By the time Greater Brisbane was formed in 1925, the need for further cross river links had been established. Traffic across the Victoria Bridge had increased 76% from 1912 to 1925, and in 1923 it was noted that traffic tonnage had increased 49.5% in 15 months. The Victoria Bridge also contributed to traffic congestion in the Brisbane CBD as all traffic between the suburbs on the north and south sides of the river had to pass through the CBD. The 1897 Victoria Bridge had a paved deck with bituminous surfacing on wrought iron troughing. Between 1920 and 1922 this paving was replaced by concrete, causing traffic congestion. In 1922, the need for additional traffic on Victoria Bridge was identified, and the Mayor of Brisbane noted the need for cross river traffic as pressing and urgent. The Victoria Bridge structure was investigated in 1923 to determine its strength for further loading, and Walter James Doak, Bridge Engineer of the Queensland Railways, noted that the bridge is now loaded to rather more than its orthodox capacity under live load, but it was considered that there was no immediate danger of collapse. His recommendations included various repairs, and that a second bridge should be built.

The first meeting of the Greater Brisbane Council in March 1925 passed a motion concerning the employment of experts to investigate what cross river facilities were required and their best locations. Mayor William Alfred Jolly was Chairman of the Bridges and Ferries Committee, and recommended that three experts be employed. A motion was passed on 20 May 1925 to appoint a Cross River Commission, which reported on 11 January 1926 (chairman Roger Hawken, Professor of Engineering at the University of Queensland, William Muir Nelson and Ronald Martin Wilson). The report showed 11 proposed river crossings, and considered costs and savings made due to the reduction in haulage costs etc., and the need for a railway bridge was also discussed. A bridge at Grey Street would be a bypass for motor traffic between the southern suburbs and western suburbs of Brisbane to avoid increasing traffic congestion on the Victoria Bridge and on CBD streets such as George Street. A crossing at Kangaroo Point (where the Story Bridge was later built) was estimated to cost 6 times the Grey Street crossing, and further reports were commissioned from William John Earle, the City Planner, and Eneas Fraser Gilchrist, the City Engineer. These reports proposed the Grey Street bridge be two level for road and rail traffic, and a second bridge from Wellington Road to Sydney Street, New Farm, with a major ring road called the Main Parkway Boulevard, be constructed.

On 7 June 1926 Council decided to build a bridge from Grey Street, South Brisbane. However, Gilchrist Avenue (named after EF Gilchrist City Engineer), which is on the other side of the rail line to the proposed Main Parkway Boulevard, is in essence part of the proposed traffic system for the Grey Street Bridge as per Earle's recommended ring road system. The existing Gilchrist Avenue's original drawings are dated 25 June 1930.

The Council called applications for a bridge engineer to design a steel or reinforced concrete bridge on 10 July 1926. Harding Frew, a local but prominent civil engineer, was appointed Engineer for the bridge on 12 November 1926.

Problems were encountered with the design of the bridge due to the depth of rock below the river bed increasing from approximately 14 to 23 metres (46 to 75 ft) on the southern bank. Due to the costly foundation work, a bridge type with long spans was chosen. Harding Frew considered five bridge types, each a variation on a theme, stating in his report that:

"it is frankly admitted that the purely economical aspect alone has not been given as much weight... as the consideration of utility, with good taste, combined with minimum maintenance cost. ... The maintenance requirements for, and performance of, steel bridges was also noted as a concern."

Harding Frew recommended bridge type A and the Council adopted his recommendation, of which some of the details of approaches etc. changed from design to construction. The chosen bridge design was to be of concrete-encased steel with arched ribs which rise through the deck. The final decision of the type of bridge, from the five under consideration, was essentially aesthetic, and was influenced by the so-called Rainbow Arch Bridge, carrying Robert Street, St Paul, Minnesota across the Mississippi River. Harding Frew acknowledged this in his report, including photographs of the bridge, and stated that:

"the time has come when some improvement in the appearance of our city bridges should be looked for in Queensland. ...The questions of utility and aesthetics should also be weighed carefully, especially in relation to a city's importance, its civic pride, and its future."

The selected bridge design differed from the St Paul bridge in that it has three major spans whereas the St Paul bridge only has one, and this has been suggested as possibly making the William Jolly Bridge unique.

The council resumed large areas of land bounded by Roma, Saul and Skew Streets, and between Skew Street, Eagle Terrace and North Quay on the northern side, and on the southern side, east of Grey Street between Montague Road and Melbourne Street. The final position of the bridge was determined by Harding Frew's recommendations (Earle and Gilchrist's were slightly upstream from the present site) and was accepted by Council in late 1926. The bridge was to have a North Quay underpass, and the estimated total cost was £700,000 including viaducts, compulsory acquisitions, roadways, approaches and contingencies. This caused dismay, and the Commissioner for Main Roads considered that the cost should be contained to £500,000 by reducing the North Quay roadworks, minimising resumptions and building a different type of bridge.

Nevertheless, Council called tenders and MR Hornibrook Ltd submitted the lowest of £384,850 and this was accepted on 8 May 1928. Work commenced in August 1928 and was completed in March 1932.

An artist's impression at the time of construction shows trams crossing the bridge with overhead cables, a monument of some kind at the intersection of Skew and Saul Streets, and a different number of viaducts on southern side to those actually built.

An incident occurred on 17 February 1927 which highlighted the potentially disastrous situation of having only one bridge across the Brisbane River. The cargo steamer Chronos was taken upstream by a rising tide and the bow was wedged under the Victoria Bridge. Tugs managed to pull it out eventually, but the rising tide could have dislodged a span of the bridge and dumped it in the river, and this was highlighted in the press at the time.

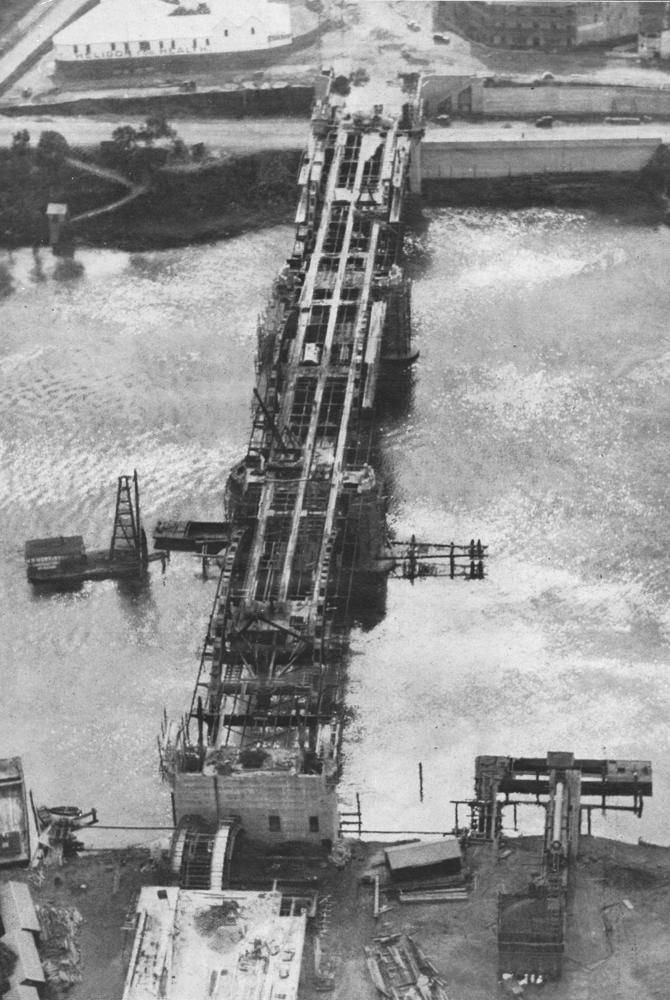
Aerial view of the Grey Street Bridge during construction, 1931

As mentioned, the depth-to-rock over much of the length of the William Jolly Bridge posed a major problem in the design of the foundations. The original design had the piers supported on timber piles, with inclined piles to resist the thrust from the small arch. Piles were driven immediately to the south of the pier, but it became impossible to drive them into the rock and the design was changed to utilise reinforced concrete caissons (heavy, hollow, vertical reinforced concrete cylinders), and the contractor was noted as being completely in accord with this decision. The southern approach spans piers founded on timber piles all driven to rock, or to such depths as it was possible to drive them without damage, and the river piers are founded on reinforced concrete caissons. To achieve this the Sand Island method was invented by Manuel Hornibrook (1893–1970).

The Sand Island is an artificial island constructed by placing sand within a closed ring of sheet piles driven into the bed of the river. Two islands were constructed for each pier (one for each of the cylindrical caissons) with the caissons being 28 feet (8.5 m) in diameter at the base. The pier on the sloping mud bank also used this method with rectangular caissons. Hornibrook is quoted as stating:

"...as far as I am concerned the idea is an original one....The idea came to me one morning about 3 o'clock. I was so much taken up with it that I got out of bed and commenced to design a scheme to carry out the piers for the Grey Street Bridge."

The use of Sand Islands was highly successful and very accurate, and overcame the problem of requiring the cutting edge to be placed directly on dry ground. The material was dredged out of the centre of the caisson and the cylinder progressively sank; however it was necessary to ensure that the caisson was fixed securely to rock and it was therefore essential to ensure man-access into the cylinder. This was achieved by using an air-lock system, but as the men worked under high pressure they could possibly suffer from the bends and an hospital air-lock was located at the surface for repressurisation if required. The foundations for the bridge were very deep, and the experience gained in the construction of this bridge, and later the Story Bridge, was considered of great value and to be a major achievement.

The steelwork was fabricated at the Evans Deakin & Company plant at Rocklea, and the arches had just been fixed in place when, on 5 February 1931 a major flood swept timber falsework away but fortunately the steelwork remained in place.

The steelwork was encased in gunite, a sprayed dry mix concrete, the process of which was based on an invention in the United States at turn of century to spray plaster of paris in the reconstruction of skeletons of prehistoric animals. Between 1904 and 1909 this method was modified to spray sand and cement using a machine known as a Cement- Gun. Gunite was copyrighted in 1912 and continued as a proprietary trademark until 1967, when it became a generic term. The process involves a mixture of sand and cement which is loaded into one chamber, a stream of the dry mixture is forced along a delivery pipe to the gun, and on discharge is mixed with an annular jet of water. It was only in the 1920s that the process spread internationally, and it is difficult to ascertain whether other examples of bridges using the Gunite process, beside the St Paul Minnesota bridge, exist. It would appear that the use of Gunite in the arches, beams, deck members and hangers of the main spans, is a major early use of the process in Australia. The Opening Booklet for the bridge states:

"The encasing of broad flange beams with concrete applied under pressure introduces new methods to Brisbane."

The southern approach of the bridge, to the south of Montague Road, was designed to have wider footpaths and roadway than the remainder of the bridge to conform with the decision of the council to utilise this portion of the approach, so that access might be had to abutting buildings (directly) from the bridge roadway.

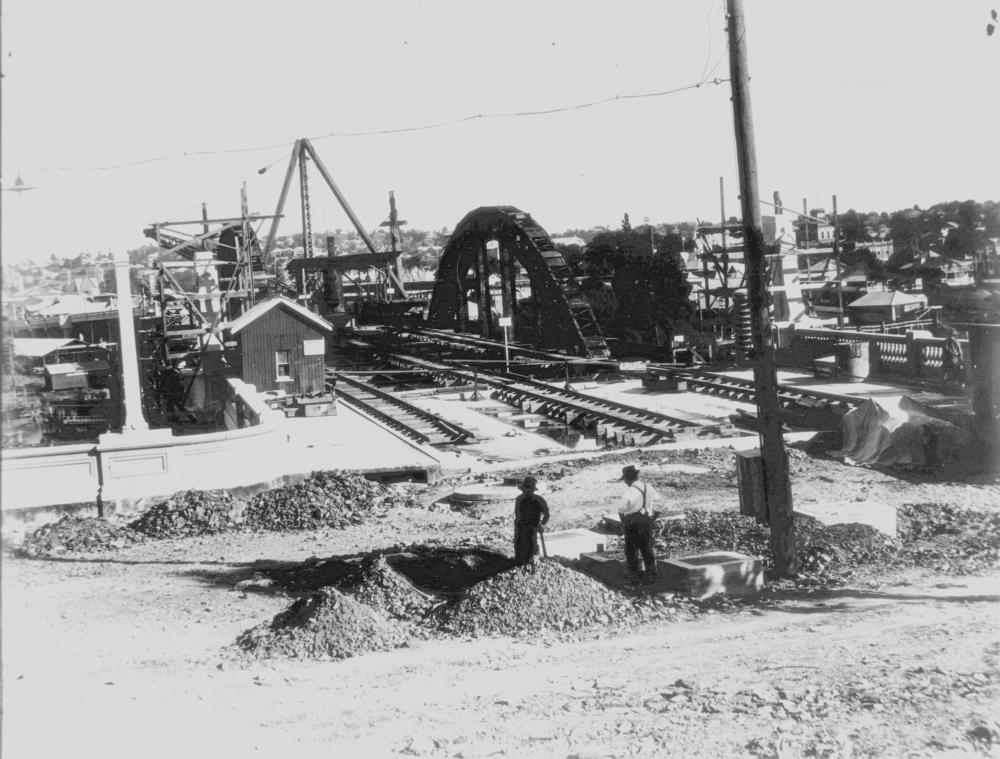
Construction of the William Jolly Bridge, Brisbane, c. 1931

The concrete balustrades were made by the Hume Pipe Company, and were centrifugally cast in their factory at West End. The Hume brothers invented the centrifugal casting method, for the casting of concrete pipes etc., and their firm was established in Adelaide in 1910. The mould for the grotesques, which decorate the bridge, was made by Karma Eklund, daughter of the State Manager, Hugo Eklund.

The structural steelwork including angles, plates, channels etc. was almost wholly imported from Great Britain. Broad flange beams were supplied from Belgium, the largest being 30 x 12 inches (300 mm) which were larger than Australian rolled beams at the time. The use of large sections in the southern approaches allowed longer spans thereby reducing the number of piers. The cement and aggregate was supplied by the Queensland Cement and Lime Company.

Provision for a major water pipe never eventuated, and the closer spacing of stringers in the centre to support a tramway was not utilised. The decorative towers were intended to support overhead cables for the proposed tramway. The bridge originally crossed the North Quay underpass on two continuous, reinforced-concrete girder spans, each 33 feet (10 m) with girders of variable depth. These have since been replaced by precast, prestressed concrete deck units above Coronation Drive, which links onto the Riverside Expressway, and in the process the footpath widths have been reduced.

The extent of work included in the bridge contract excluded some retaining walls, roadways etc. on the northern side which were designed by the council. A statement was presented to the council on 14 November 1933 showing the official final cost as £688,387/12/5.

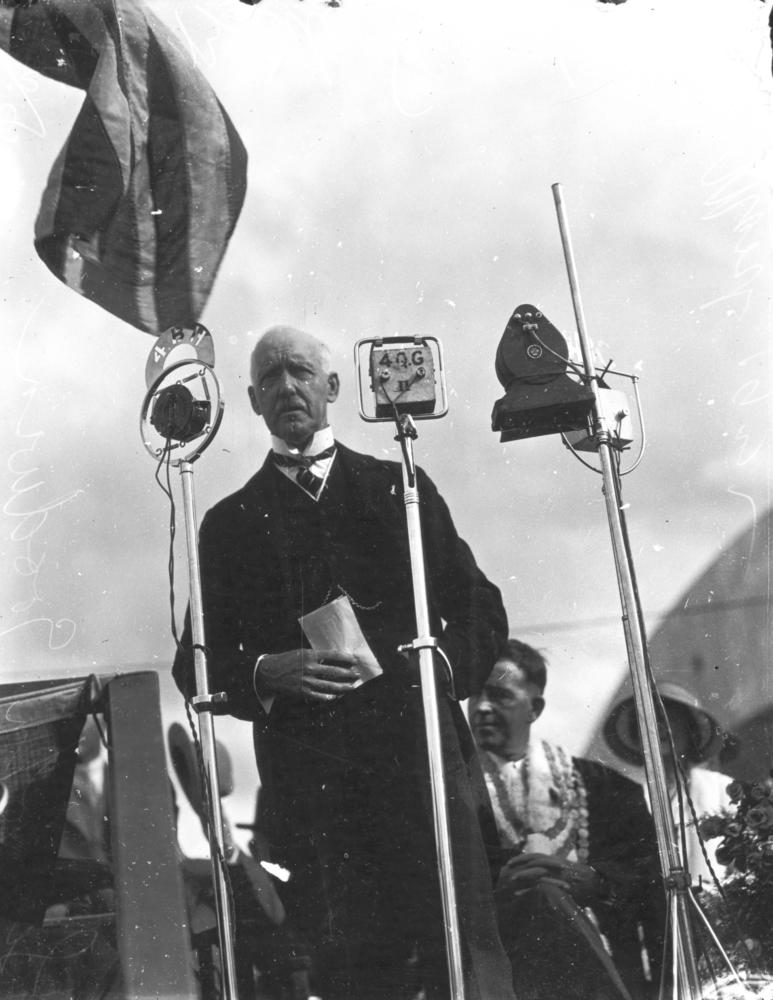
Governor John Goodwin speaking at the opening of the bridge, 1932

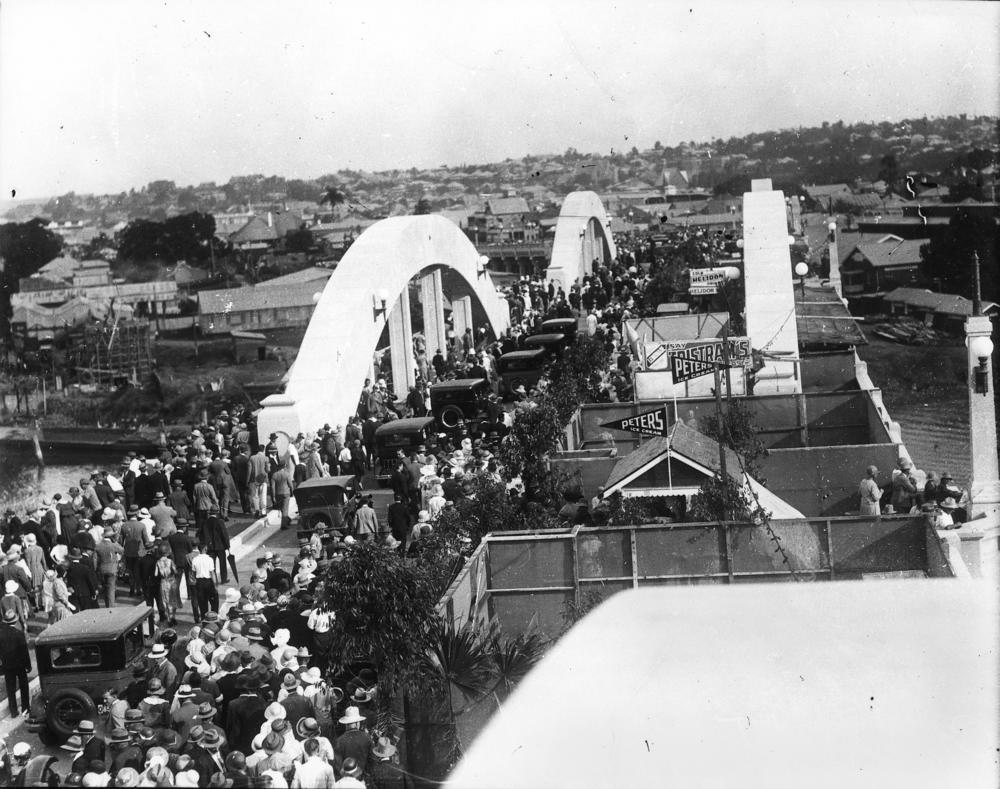
Crowds gathered for the opening of the bridge, 1932

The Grey Street Bridge opened on 30 March 1932. The bridge was officially opened to traffic on 30 March 1932 by Sir John Goodwin, the Governor of Queensland, just eleven days after the opening of the Sydney Harbour Bridge. A large crowd gathered on both sides of the river and 600 invited guests were in attendance.

There was great community interest in the massive public works under construction at the time. It was the era of the Great Depression and massive public works, and Vida Lahey, a distinguished Queensland artist, painted the bridge at least three times during its construction. She also painted other public works including Anzac Square, the State Government Offices (Anzac Square Building), and the Central railway station. Although there was widespread public interest in the bridge, it was eclipsed within ten years by the much larger and more prominent Story Bridge.

An unusual feature of the Grey Street Bridge is that the arches rise through the deck. It is noted that those living in Brisbane tend to regard this as normal for a bridge of this type; however this is in fact most unusual and few bridges around the world, including the Sydney Harbour Bridge, have this feature. The problem confronting Harding Frew was not the span-t- rise ratio of the arch itself, but rather its effect on the design of the deep foundations required at the site.

The bridge was designed to alleviate the traffic on the Victoria Bridge, but by as early as 1939 it was carrying 45% of the cross river traffic and was effectively doing more than it was designed to achieve.

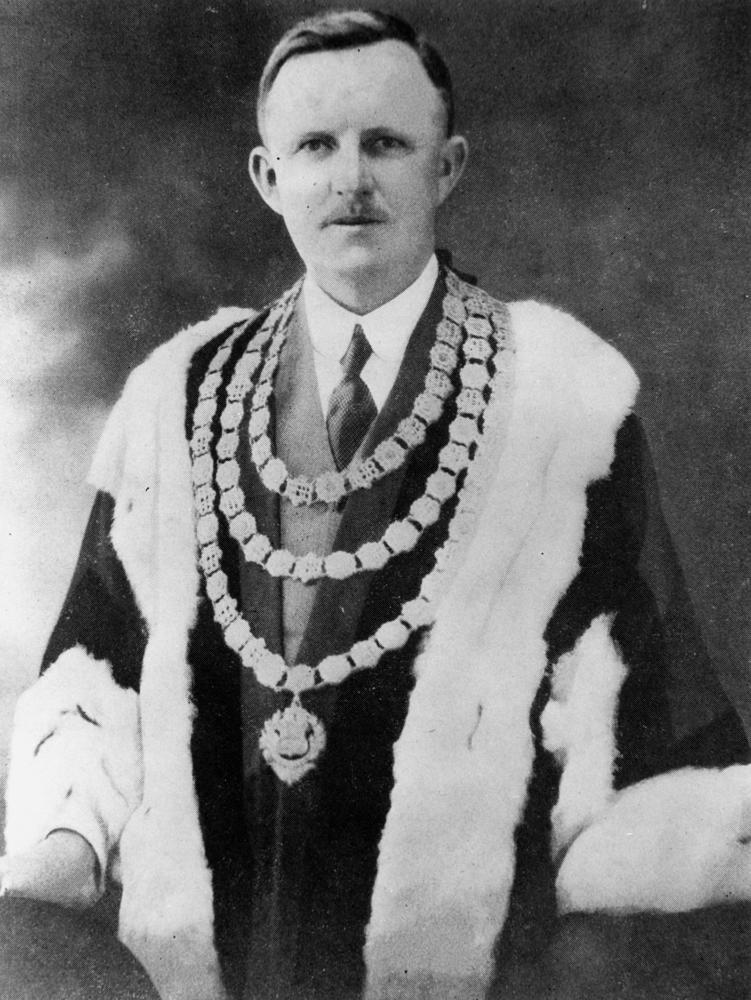
William Jolly, after whom the bridge was named in 1955

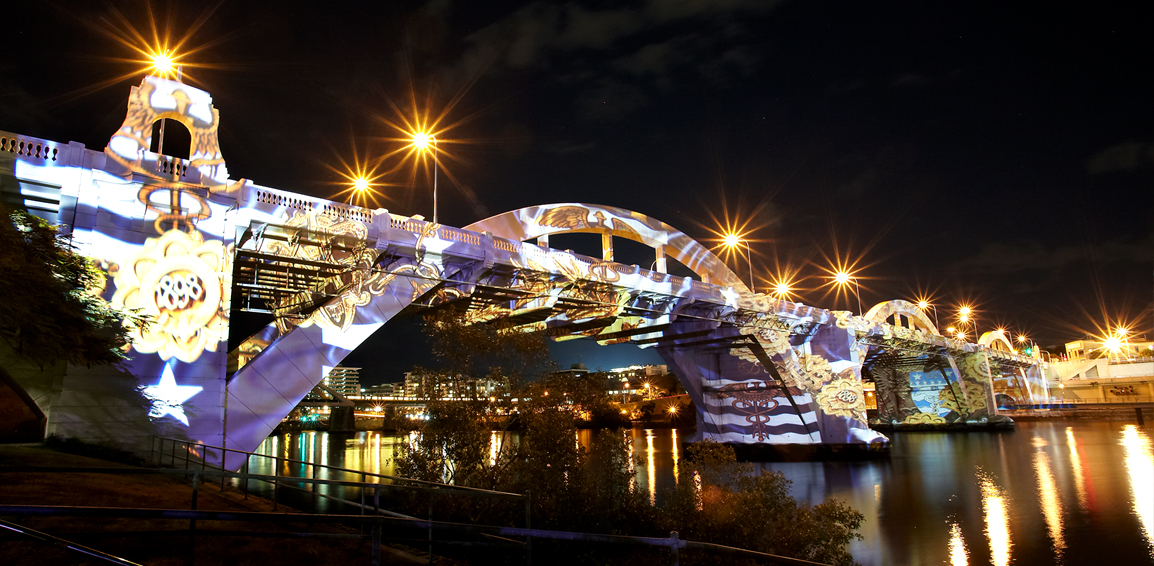
Light show on the bridge, depicting the mayoral regalia, 2010

On 5 July 1955, the Council decided to rename the bridge the William Jolly Bridge, in honour of William Alfred Jolly (1881–1955). Jolly was Alderman of Windsor Town Council from 1912 to 1925, including 5 years as Mayor. On 21 February 1925 he was elected first Mayor (later Lord Mayor) of the Greater Brisbane Council for six years until his retirement in 1931. John William Greene was the lord mayor when the bridge was opened. Jolly had moved the motions which led to the construction of the bridge. The Greater Brisbane Act gave the council a charter which vested in the council the power to frame its own legislation and the Council proceeded with a bold policy of civic improvements, including the Grey Street Bridge, the newBrisbane City Hall, Anzac Square, the tramways, water supply and sewerage.

Originally the bridge, roadways and footpaths were illuminated by spherical glass light fittings on cast metal mountings on both sides of the arches and the decorative arches of the tower-like elements. These fittings were replaced by the present lighting in 1964.

Many of the balustrades have been replaced, and prior to 1972 the complete roadway was resurfaced with asphalt. The bridge was first painted in 1974. A cream colour was chosen to reflect the approximate colour of newly poured concrete. Floodlighting was also introduced in 1974.

The original two-span overpass over North Quay, later over Coronation Drive, was replaced by the present single-span structure using precast, prestressed concrete deck units in 1988.

== Description ==
The William Jolly Bridge crosses the Brisbane River at the tip of the South Brisbane peninsula between Grey Street, South Brisbane, and North Quay at the intersection of Skew and Saul Streets on the northern bank. The bridge carries four lanes of traffic with pedestrian paths to either side, and retaining walls return at right angles to the bridge at the northern end supporting North Quay above.

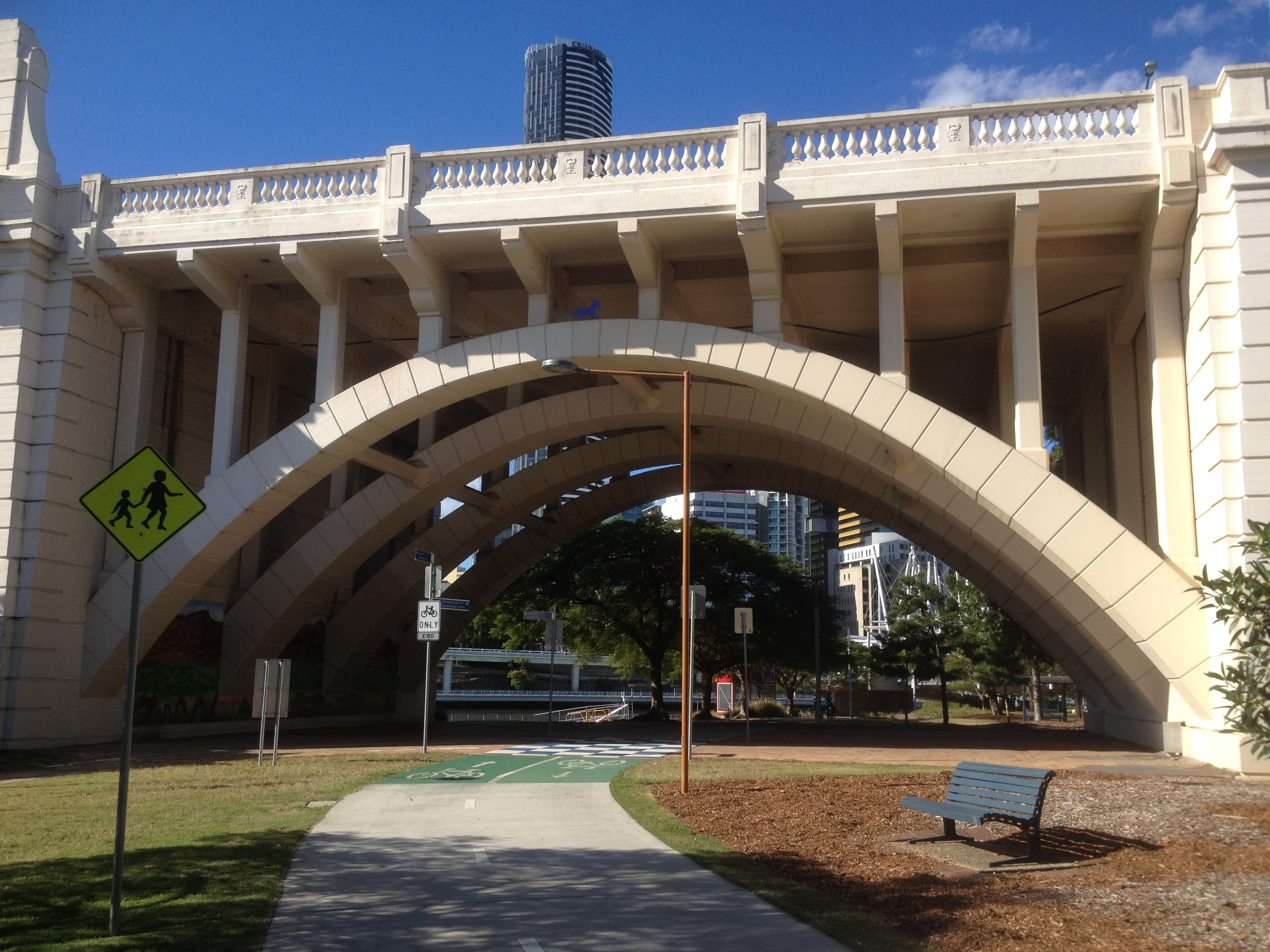
Viaducts on the southern side ramping down towards Grey Street, 2014

The bridge spans between ground level on the higher northern bank, ramping down to Grey Street inland from the southern bank. To achieve this, the bridge was constructed with three major spans of arched ribs across the river, with two smaller arches at the northern embankment and a single arch at the southern embankment, and a viaduct consisting of 16 spans ramping down to Grey Street to the south. The southern ramping section curves towards the southeast in plan, crossing Montague Road to align with Grey Street. The two smaller arches at the northern embankment are no longer extant, and have been replaced by precast, prestressed concrete deck units above Coronation Drive, which links onto the riverside expressway.

The bridge is constructed of concrete encased steel, with the three major spans of arched ribs rising through the deck. The roadway is partly supported by hangers from the arches which project above, and cross girders and stringers below. The ramping southern section roadway is supported by longitudinal broad flange beams supported by rows of piers, with the southern end abutment being earth filled between reinforced concrete retaining walls.

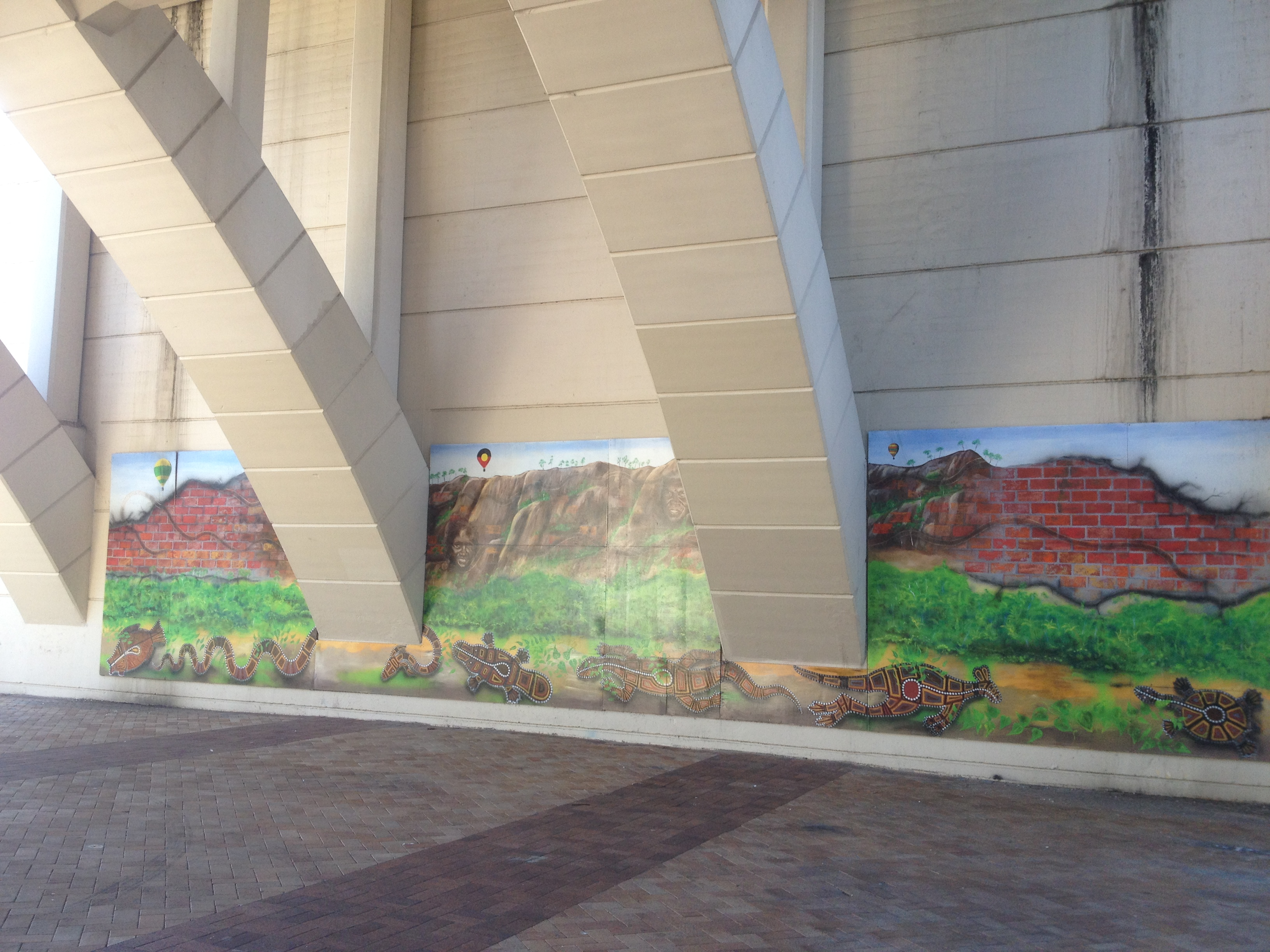
Oversized coursing on the bridge with a contemporary Indigenous mural, 2014

A misconception at the time of construction was that the concrete encasing was decorative and was only used to hide the structural steelwork of the bridge. This was incorrect as the bridge was designed as a reinforced concrete structure, with the steelwork acting as reinforcing and the concrete carrying a major part of the load. However, the concrete is also used in a decorative manner to represent oversized coursing on the main piers and voussoirs on the arched ribs.

Other decorative features include grotesques to the outer face of some balustrades, and a floral-like motif at either side of the top of the four ornamental tower-like elements. These four tower-like elements frame both entrances to the bridge, surmounting the end piers of the cross-river section, and each consists of an arched opening to a projecting balcony with a stepped crown surmounted by a metal spire. These were originally intended to have the functional purpose of supporting the overhead cables for the proposed electric tramway.

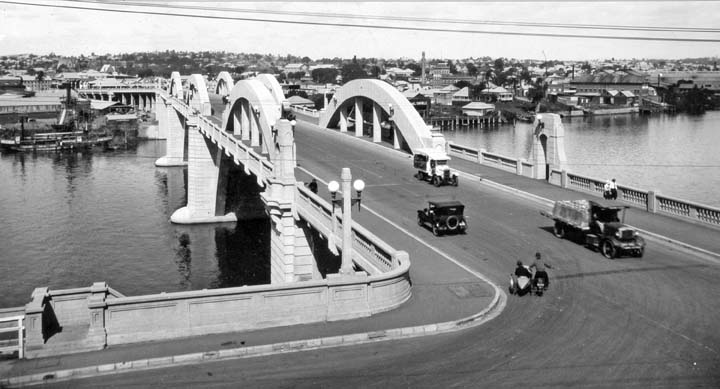
Northern approach to the bridge, the top of the stairs down to North Quay is visible to the left, circa 1932

The bridge has cast concrete balustrades, and carefully detailed elements such as the curved ends to the concrete encased cross girders beneath the roadway, and the termination blocks for the upper portions of the arched ribs. Openings in the cross girders below the roadway, intended for a major water pipe which was not installed, are evident.

A pedestrian stair with iron balustrade is located on the southern side of Montague Road and rises through the southwestern footpath. A stair is also located within the North Quay retaining wall on the northeastern side of the bridge connecting North Quay and Coronation Drive. This stair has a solid concrete balustrade, and is no longer accessible from below.

Street lighting has been installed along the length of the bridge, and traffic lights are located at the northern end.

== Traffic use ==
The William Jolly Bridge is shared by vehicular traffic, pedestrians and cyclists. It connects Grey Street in South Brisbane to Roma Street on the western edge of the Brisbane central business district. It was constructed with the intention of building tram lines over it and although the tracks were never installed, anchor points for tramway overhead were installed at the top of each arch. These overhead anchor points remain in situ.

=== Congestion ===
The bridge has two lanes for motor traffic in each direction, and a footpath on each side of the bridge.

Although designed to reduce congestion on the existing Victoria Bridge and within the CBD, the bridge created new congestion issues of its own, as it put considerable pressure on the Normanby Fiveways intersection making it one of Brisbane's most congested and dangerous intersections.

By 2006, the Brisbane City Council reported that on a typical weekday, 42000 vehicles crossed the bridge and at peak times both ends of the bridge suffered from congestion. The Go Between Bridge, opened in 2010, was intended to relieve some of the congestion on the William Jolly Bridge; however it has not achieved the level of use anticipated and operates under capacity, possibly because the Go Between Bridge is a toll bridge while the nearby William Jolly Bridge remains free to use.

== In popular culture ==
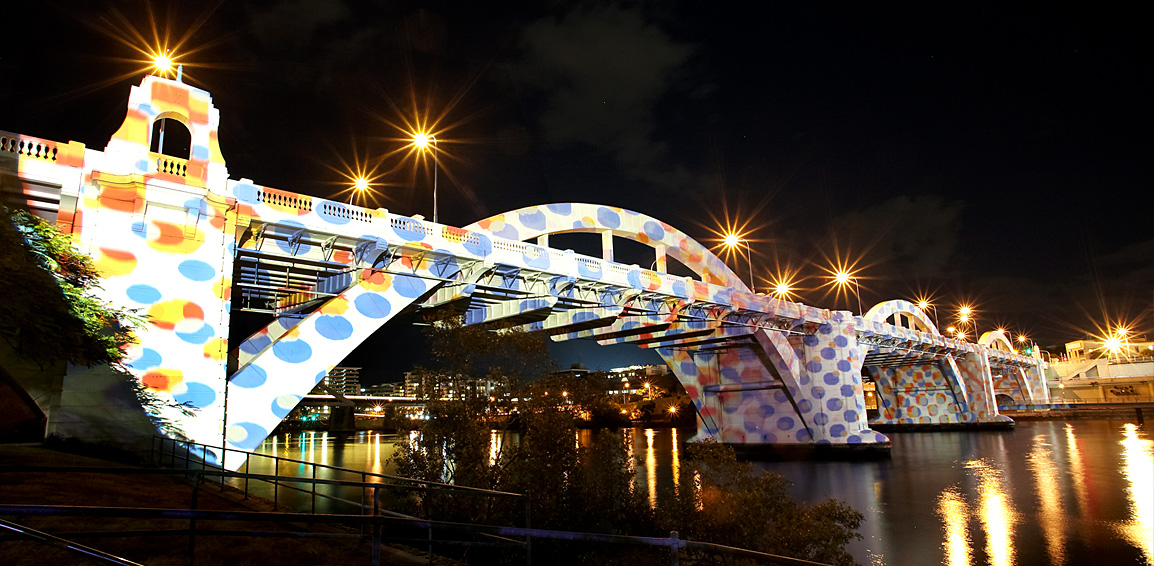
Bridge lightshow "Pixels", 2010

In 2003 the bridge was a location for the filming of Inspector Gadget 2.

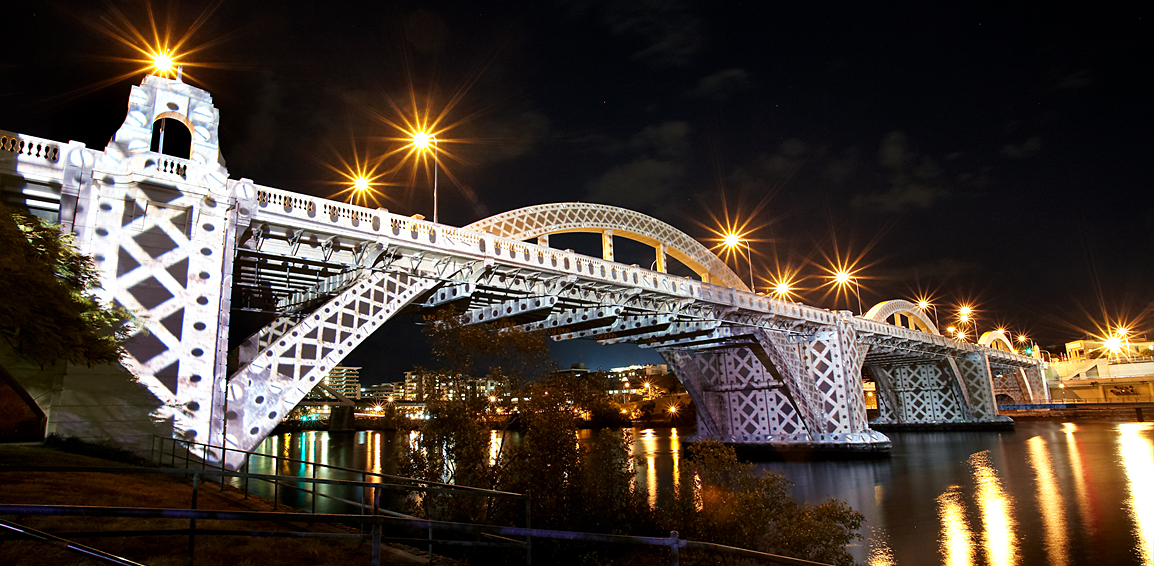
Bridge lightshow "Meccano", 2010

From 2009, the bridge is being used as a canvas for artistic light shows. Two towers, five metres high, are used to project images onto the bridge. The cost of the project was $2,000,000.

== Heritage listing ==
William Jolly Bridge was listed on the Queensland Heritage Register on 6 August 1996 having satisfied the following criteria.

The place is important in demonstrating the evolution or pattern of Queensland's history.

The William Jolly Bridge was constructed between 1928 and 1932 following the formation of Greater Brisbane in 1925, and was one of the first major capital works of the new city Council being part of a bold policy of civic improvements under the provisions of the Greater Brisbane Act. The construction of the bridge was seen as a symbol of the unification of Greater Brisbane, and the bridge bears the name of the new city Council's first Mayor, and later Lord Mayor, William Alfred Jolly, who was Chairman of the Bridges and Ferries Committee and who had moved the motions which led to the construction of the bridge.

The William Jolly Bridge is located at the tip of the South Brisbane peninsula, a location which traditionally has been a point of crossing of the Brisbane River from pre-European settlement. Aboriginal and later European pathways and land use patterns formed the basis for subsequent traffic networks which are reflected in the location of the bridge and associated traffic systems. It was Brisbane's second traffic bridge and provided an important transport and communications link between both sides of the river, as well as further impetus for the development of the South Brisbane peninsula.

The place demonstrates rare, uncommon or endangered aspects of Queensland's cultural heritage.

The design of the bridge is unusual in its use of three major spans of arched ribs which rise through the deck, which give the bridge a distinctive appearance and a landmark quality.

The place is important because of its aesthetic significance.

The design of the William Jolly Bridge was intended to reflect the city's importance and its civic pride. Constructed of concrete encased steel, the bridge has a monument-like quality, with grotesques and representations of oversized coursing on the main piers and voussoirs on the arched ribs.

The design of the bridge is unusual in its use of three major spans of arched ribs which rise through the deck, which give the bridge a distinctive appearance and a landmark quality.

The place is important in demonstrating a high degree of creative or technical achievement at a particular period.

The William Jolly Bridge demonstrates a high degree of technical achievement in its design, its use of Gunite (sprayed dry mix concrete), and in the development of the Sand Island method used for the construction of its river piers.

The place has a special association with the life or work of a particular person, group or organisation of importance in Queensland's history.

The William Jolly Bridge was designed by AE Harding Frew, a distinguished Brisbane engineer, and was a major work by Queensland contractors Evans Deakin and Co and MR Hornibrook Ltd.

== See also ==
- Bridges over the Brisbane River
