= William Street retaining wall =

Historic embankment in Brisbane, Queensland

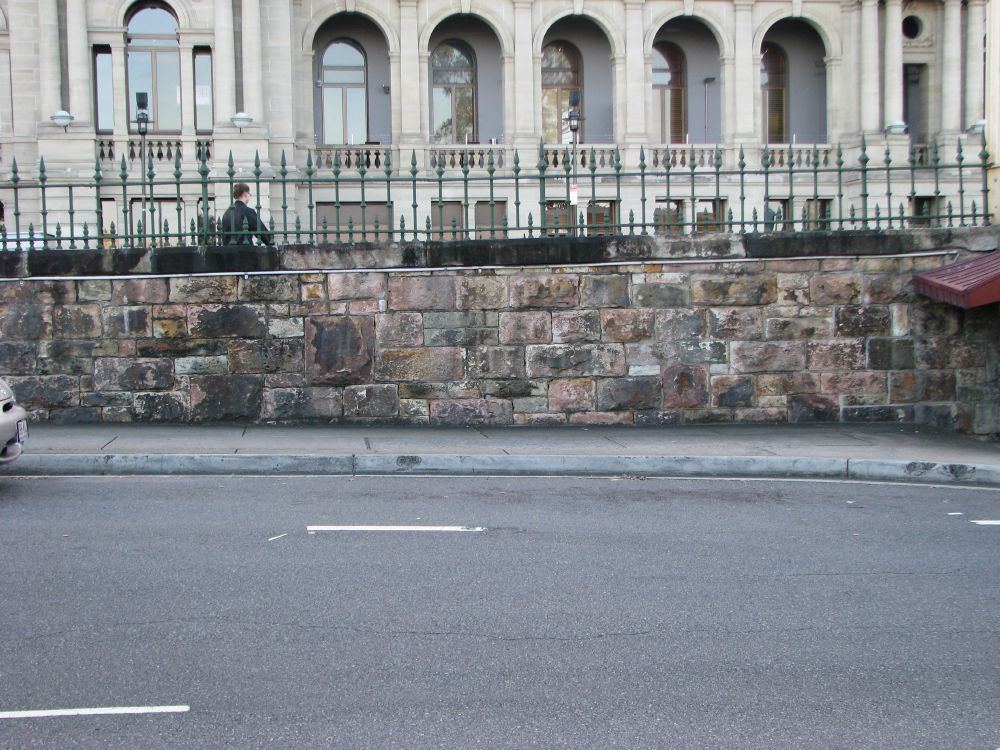
- William Street retaining wall (seen from Queens Wharf Road), 2008

- Location within Queensland Location within Australia
- 27.4721°S 153.0231°E
- Location: William Street, Brisbane City, City of Brisbane, Queensland, Australia

History
- Design period: 1870s–1890s (late 19th century)
- Built: 1889–1970s

Queensland Heritage Register
- Official name: William Street and Queens Wharf Road retaining walls, North Quay porphyry wall
- Type: state heritage (built)
- Designated: 21 October 1992
- Reference no.: 600135
- Significant period: 1880s, 1920s, 1930s, 1940s, 1970s (fabric)
- Significant components: toilet block/earth closet/water closet, bus shelter, wall/s – retaining, kerbing and channelling, fencing, drinking fountain, gate/s, gas lamp post, wall/s, steps/stairway, abutments – road bridge, air raid shelter

William Street retaining wall is a heritage-listed embankment at William Street, Brisbane City, City of Brisbane, Queensland, Australia. It was built from 1889 to 1970s. It is also known as William Street & Queens Wharf Road retaining walls and North Quay porphry wall. It was added to the Queensland Heritage Register on 21 October 1992.

== History ==
This retaining wall was planned in 1888 to endow William Street with some aesthetic distinction to complement the new Treasury Building being erected opposite the site. The Victoria Bridge end of an old rubble wall along William Street was to be replaced by a porphyry and sandstone wall with an elaborate cast iron railing and a small pissoir built into the wall at the Elizabeth Street end.

In November 1888 the contract was awarded to EJ O'Connor, who in the previous year had stabilised the large porphyry retaining wall at Queen Street, Petrie Bight (the Petrie Bight Retaining Wall). Within five months O'Connor was contracted to excavate and reform William Street and build the retaining wall for £1431. By the time Cabinet first met in the new Treasury Building in 1889, the wall, railing and gas lamp in William Street were completed.

The marble end post was a gift to Mayor William McNaughton Galloway from the Mayor of Adelaide, who had visited Brisbane whilst the wall was being completed. The railing and the elaborate gas lantern were made by local firm Smith Faulkner & Co (formerly Smith Forrester & Co), who also had provided the cast iron railing for the large retaining wall at Petrie's Bight.

By 1890 a cab stand had been established at the Victoria Bridge end of the William Street wall. By the turn of the century the cabs had been supplanted by horse-drawn buses, and a small timber and iron shelter for the convenience of waiting passengers had been erected on the William Street pavement abutting the end railing. This was removed by about 1910.

Until 1928 when the Queen Street frontage of the Treasury Building was completed, the William Street frontage was an important focus for official occasions. In January 1901 large crowds congregated in front of the wall to hear Lord Lamington proclaim the Commonwealth of Australia from a balcony of the Treasury Building opposite.

In the decades that followed, the wall served more practical purposes. In the twentieth century motorbuses replaced the horse-drawn vehicles lined along William Street, and by the early 1930s a large timber bus timetable sign had been erected against the railing of the retaining wall.

In the 1920s or early 1930s, fill under the William Street footpath was excavated to accommodate male toilets built into the wall at the Queens Wharf Road level. Apparently at the same time, a three-metre section of the wall and railing was realigned to accommodate a stairway leading from William Street to the new public conveniences. Probably the entrance to the original pissoir was bricked over at this period also.

The decorative masonry and iron wall on the other side of Queens Wharf Road was erected in the 1930s. Plans were prepared in 1934, but the wall was not erected until 1936. It appears to have been intended to, and still does, demark the entrance to the ramp leading to Hayles Wharf, which is leased from the council. Sections of the retaining wall here were extant before this period.

As a wartime precaution, the Brisbane City Council erected an air-raid shelter on the Queens Wharf Road frontage of the William Street retaining wall, abutting the Victoria Bridge end, circa early 1940s. Above this a bus shelter, equipped with public telephones and a drinking fountain was erected on the William Street footpath in 1944. This remains a principal stop for buses servicing Brisbane's southern suburbs, but the telephones have been removed.

In the early 1970s female toilet accommodation was provided abutting the wall on Queens Wharf Road, and 20 metres (66 ft) of the wall was demolished to make way for the Elizabeth Street off-ramp for the Riverside Expressway.

== Description ==
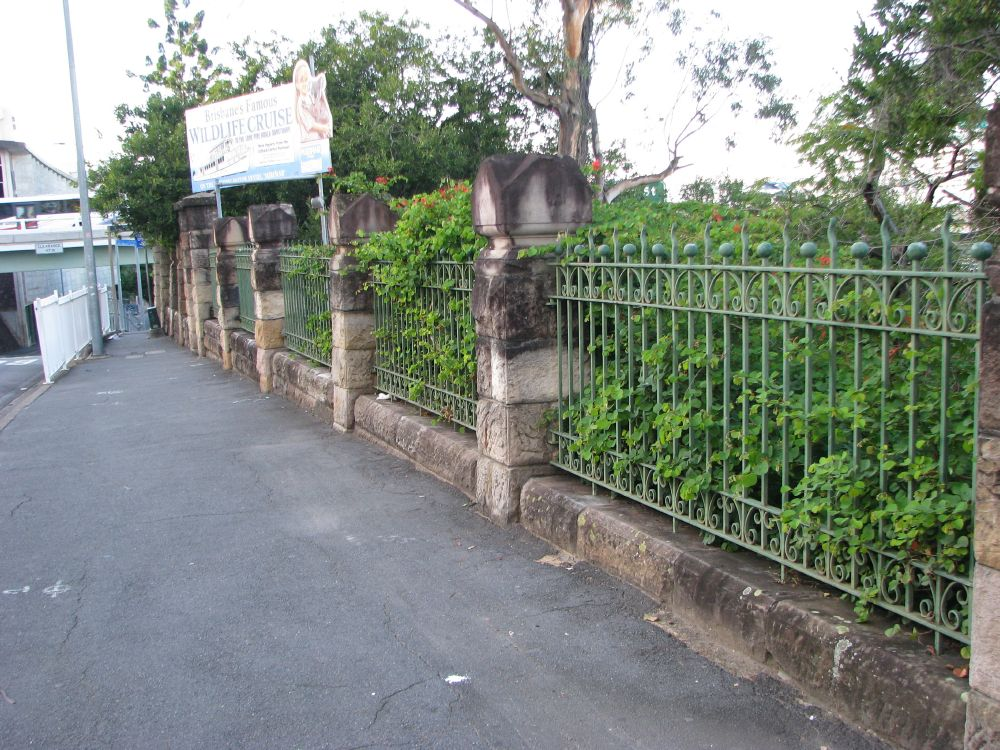
View from William Street, 2015

The William Street wall is constructed of rough-coursed porphyry (Brisbane Tuff), with a parapet, sandstone coping and decorative cast-iron railing. It extends approximately 70 metres (230 ft) along William Street between Queen and Elizabeth Streets, and reaches a maximum height of 4.5 metres (15 ft) to the Queens Wharf Road frontage. A marble pedestal terminating the wall at the Victoria Bridge end is inscribed WM Galloway Mayor 1889, and supports an elaborate gas lamp stand bearing the words Smith, Faulkner & Co. 1889.

Visually this wall forms a plinth to the Treasury Building when viewed from the direction of the river.

Original stonework and perhaps additional stones face both sides of an interwar stairwell, which has a contemporary metal railing. This leads to a men's toilet block that has been built into the wall, with windows and a door opening off Queens Wharf Road. The letters BCC are emblazoned in raised cement render in the arch above the central window.

A Second World War concrete air-raid shelter is contiguous to the wall on the Queens Wharf Road level. Above this about 15 metres (49 ft) of the parapet has been removed to accommodate a 1944 bus shelter at William Street level.

A further 30 metres (98 ft) of the parapet has been removed at the Elizabeth Street end for the building of a female toilet block so that the William Street footpath now extends onto its roof. Box steel railings have been used in this area.

Another section of original wall remains between the female toilets and the Elizabeth Street freeway exit ramp. The entrance to the original pissoir, built into the wall in this section, is bricked over.

Two lengths of stone kerbing adjacent to the wall survive on top of the cutting made when Queens Wharf Road was lowered in the 1950s.

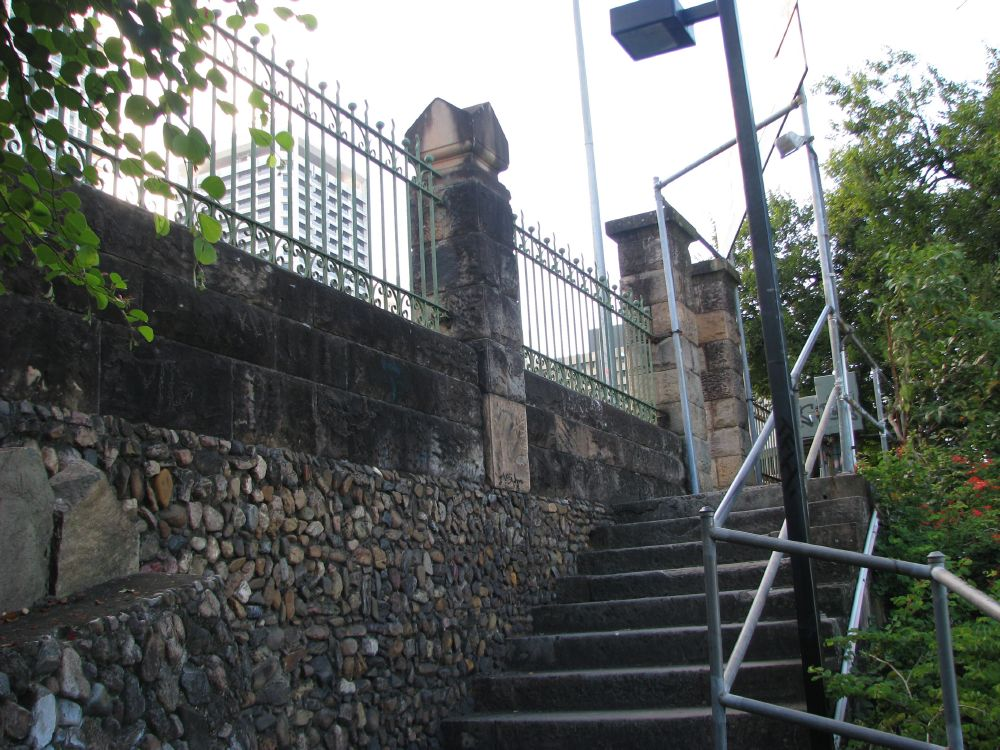
Stairway, 2008

On the other side of Queens Wharf Road is a stone and cast-iron wall that sits on a base wall of rough laid pebbles set in concrete. It consists of a decorative cast-iron railing sitting on top of a porphyry dwarf wall between porphyry pillars. Ornamental capping stones on the pillars are cut at the corners so that they form gables in elevation. Two gateways in the wall are marked by taller pillars with flat capping stones and lead to concrete steps and bitumen surfaced ramps. These ramps give access down the steep slope to the wharves below. This slope is retained by porphyry walls, pebble and concrete walls and battered earth banks.

Part of the northern abutment of the second permanent Victoria Bridge (1897) survives as the western end of the Queens Wharf Road retaining wall. Located below Queens Wharf Road and adjacent to the current Victoria Bridge, it is a substantial rock-faced porphyry structure with a smooth sloped sill stone at the junction between the base and the wall above. Adjoining the abutment is a curved battered wall, constructed of loose rough hewn porphyry blocks, that sits on a concrete base.

== Heritage listing ==
The William Street retaining wall was listed on the Queensland Heritage Register on 21 October 1992 having satisfied the following criteria.

The place is important in demonstrating the evolution or pattern of Queensland's history.

The retaining walls are important in demonstrating the evolution and pattern of Queensland's history, in particular the William Street wall, railing, lamp stand, pissoir entry, interwar toilet block and 1940s air-raid shelter, provide evidence of the civic function of the site. The retaining walls also offer surviving evidence of the 1897 Victoria Bridge.

The place is important in demonstrating the principal characteristics of a particular class of cultural places.

The iron railings and lamp stand on the William Street retaining wall are important in demonstrating the principal characteristics of the decorative work of leading 19th century Brisbane ironmongers Smith Faulkner & Co.

The place is important because of its aesthetic significance.

The retaining walls exhibit particular aesthetic characteristics valued by the community, namely the contribution of both the William Street and Queens Wharf Road retaining walls to the definition of an important ceremonial and civic space associated with the river front and the Treasury Building. The textured surface of the stone, its varied colouration and the light and open effect of the railings endow both walls with special aesthetic appeal.

The place has a strong or special association with a particular community or cultural group for social, cultural or spiritual reasons.

The site has had a strong and continuing association with Brisbane passenger transport since 1890.

== See also ==
- North Quay, Brisbane
- Coronation Drive retaining wall
