= Cook Terrace =

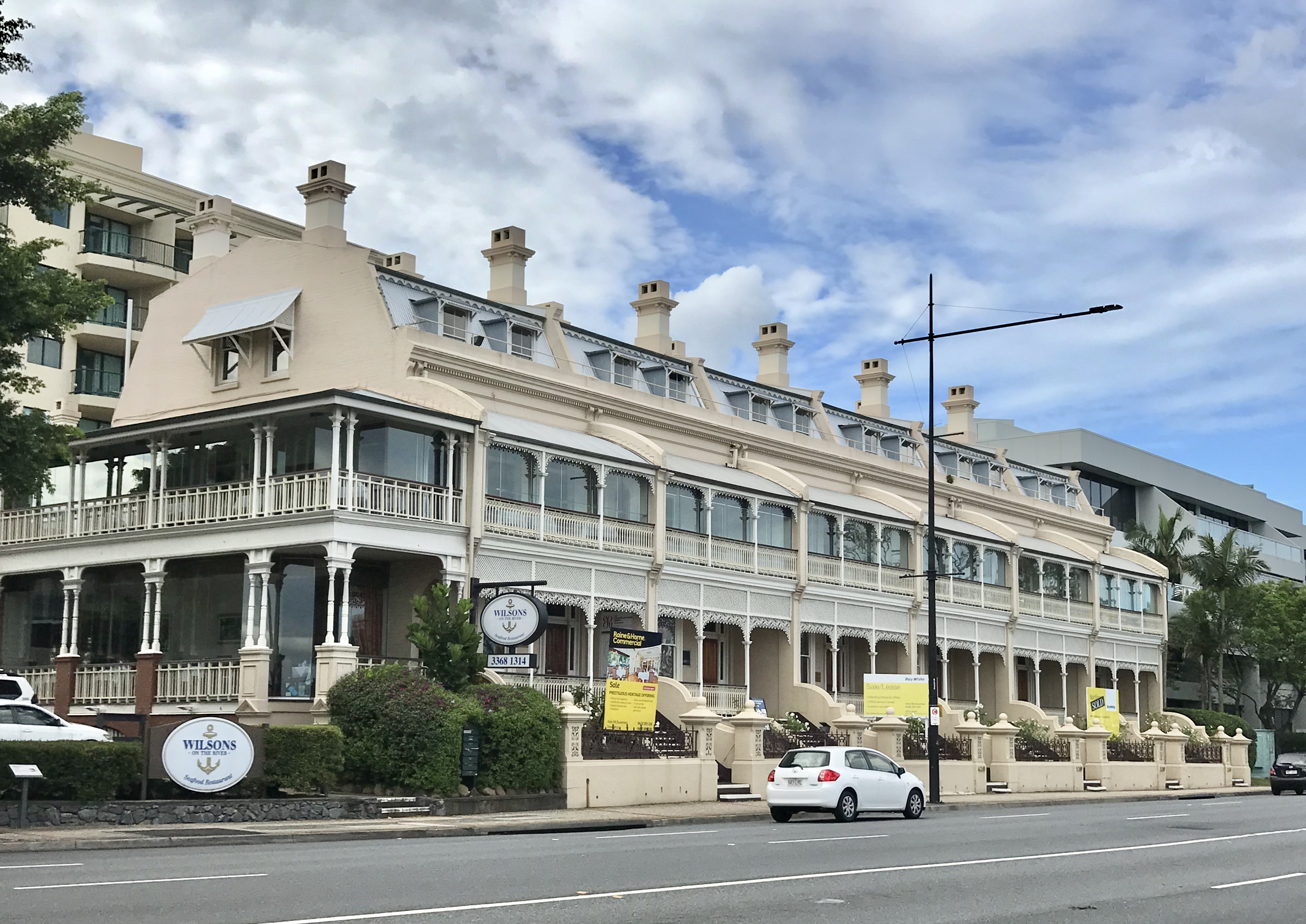
- Cook Terrace, 2017

- Location within Queensland Location within Australia
- 27.4724°S 153.0057°E
- Location: 249 Coronation Drive, Milton, City of Brisbane, Queensland, Australia

History
- Design period: 1870s–1890s (late 19th century)
- Built: 1888–c. 1900

Queensland Heritage Register
- Official name: Cook Terrace, Gloralgar Flats, Milton Terrace
- Type: state heritage (built, landscape)
- Designated: 21 October 1992
- Reference no.: 600250
- Significant period: 1880s–1900s (fabric); 1880s–1910s, 1940s (historical); 1940s–1970s (social)
- Significant components: Trees/plantings, service wing, fence/wall – perimeter, basement / sub-floor, residential accommodation – terrace house/terrace, views from, attic, views to, courtyard

Cook Terrace is a heritage-listed terrace house at 249 Coronation Drive, Milton, City of Brisbane, Queensland, Australia. It was built from 1888 to c. 1900. It is also known as Gloralgar Flats and Milton Terrace. It was added to the Queensland Heritage Register on 21 October 1992.

== History ==
This building was constructed as a two-storeyed brick row of six houses in 1888–1889 by Brisbane builder Joseph Blain Cook.

In September 1888 Cook had acquired from squatter John Frederick McDougall the title to subdivisions 1 to 6 of the Milton House estate, a section of prime real estate along the Milton Reach of the Brisbane River. He raised a mortgage of £6000 on the property to finance construction of the terrace. The first house was erected in late 1888, and the remainder of the row was completed in 1889. The architect is unknown.

The terrace was built as a rental property, the Queensland Undue Subdivision of Land Prevention Act of 1885 prohibiting the granting of titles to individual terrace houses. The enterprise reflected the economic optimism of the late 1880s, but within two years of construction Cook was declared insolvent and the terrace passed to his mortgagees.

By 1895 the row was known as Milton Terrace, and with its river views and breezes and proximity to the centre of town, it remained one of Brisbane's more prestigious rental addresses until well into the twentieth century, attracting mainly professional and white-collar tenants.

The house adjacent to Park Road was occupied by the Rourke family from about 1895 to 1905. They owned the terrace at that period and it is likely they were responsible for adding a southwestern verandah and dome room.

By 1920 each house had been subdivided into at least two flats, and builder Simon Smith, who acquired the property in 1923, may have been responsible for removing the front parapet and installing dormer windows.

By 1928 a tennis court had been established in the southwestern yard. This is no longer extant.

In the thirties the name Milton Terrace was lost, and by the end of the decade the houses were known collectively as Gloralgar Flats.

During the Second World War the flats are believed to have been rented by army authorities for officer accommodation.

In the postwar period the verandahs were enclosed and the six houses were converted into twenty-seven flats, which were considered something of a bohemian retreat. Despite its decline, the building remained a visual landmark along Coronation Drive, and in 1984 it was refurbished and recycled as offices and a restaurant.

== Description ==
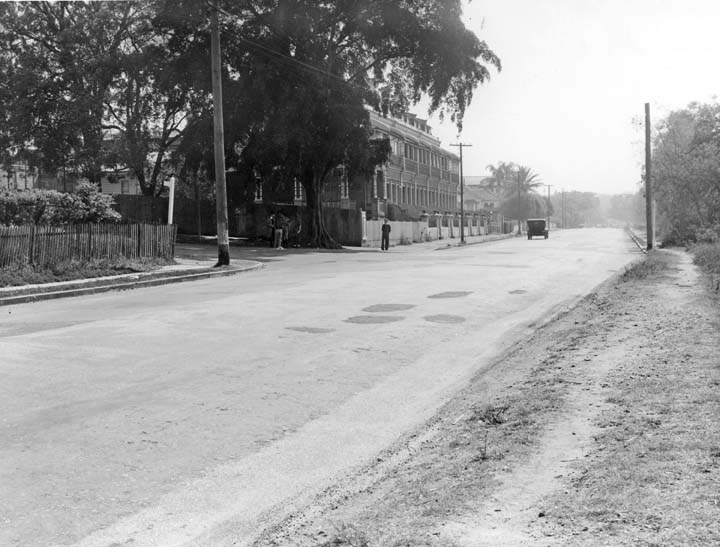
Cook Terrace, 1945

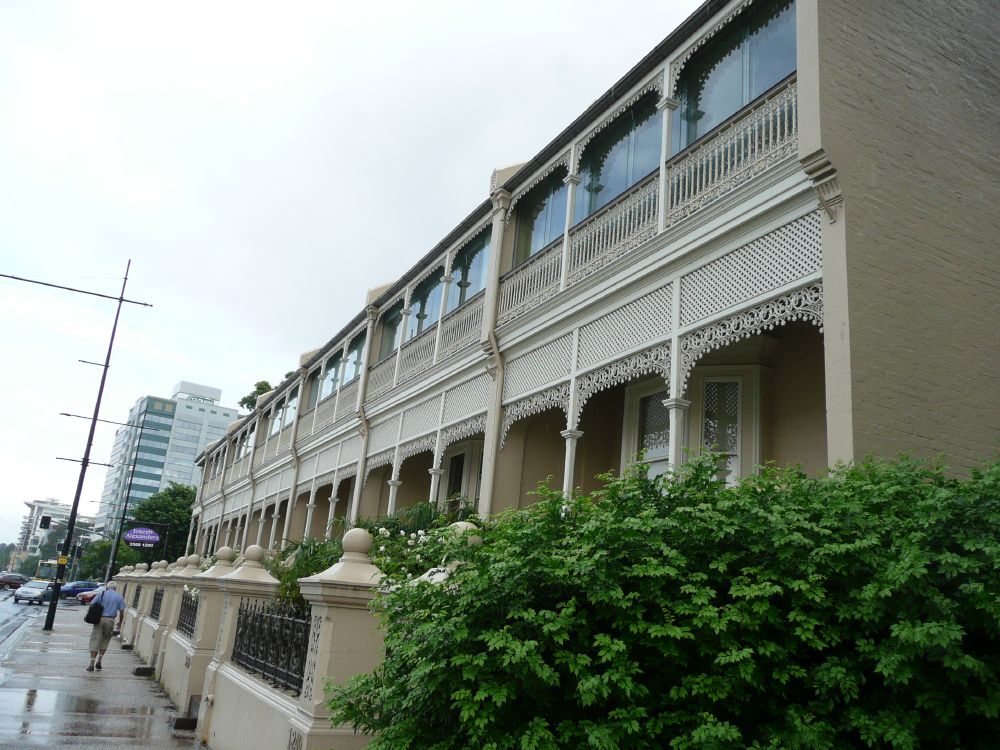
Cook Terrace frontage, 2009

Cook Terrace consists of six two-storeyed rendered brick houses, each with an attic and sub-floor.

The attics are contained within a corrugated iron mansard roof, which is divided by continuations of the party walls, which also separate the front and back verandahs.

Each attic is lit by a single dormer at the rear and a pair at the front. The latter appear to have been added at a later date, and a high front parapet of repeating circles, which partly obscured the roof, probably was removed at the same time.

Each house also has two double chimneys rising above the western dividing walls.

The front elevation is unified by supporting timber posts and capitals with cast-iron valances, brackets and balustrading, much of which has been replaced but not to the original pattern, along ground and first floors. The first floor verandahs are roofed with convex iron and overhang slightly those of the ground floor, and were glazed in 1984. A rendered front wall and stepped approaches separate the terrace from the street pavement.

Each house is constructed to an identical floor plan. On the ground floor an entrance to the side leads to the hallway from which two rooms open - originally drawing and dining rooms. These are divided by folding cedar doors, with a bay window which overlooks the river from the front room. At the far end of the hallway a cedar staircase leads to the first floor and attic.

On the first floor a broad arch separates the two main rooms, which were intended probably as bedroom and sitting room. Two sets of French doors open onto the front verandah from the main room and a smaller adjacent room, which likely was the dressing room, to its right. The rear room is lit by a triple window.

The attic also is divided into a front and back room, but the partitioning is plasterboard and no evidence of any original division is visible.

Interior finishes to each house include cedar joinery, plastered walls, marble fireplace surrounds in the ground floor rooms and tessellated entrance tiles.

Air-conditioning, sound-proofing, electronic security systems and signage, were introduced during the 1980s renovation.

Each house has a detached timber two-storeyed service wing, accessed from the rear verandah. Externally they remain substantially intact, but have been gutted. Glazed terracotta paving tiles, bearing the name "J Petrie" (most likely a reference to John Petrie) on the reverse, line the courtyards between the kitchen houses.

Around the turn of the century the western house was remodelled to include: a verandah extension with decorative timber elements of the Federation period along the side wall; a "dome room" rear addition which features a high coffered ceiling with arched timber ribs, 4-inch (100 mm) tongue-and-groove lining boards, chair rail, and fireplace with its original picture tiles; and pressed metal ceilings and ornamental pillars with capitals in the archway of the two ground floor rooms.

Cook Terrace is situated on one of the busiest arterial roads linking the western suburbs with the centre of the city. The river view remains undisturbed, and the mature fig tree in the grounds at the corner of Park Road and Coronation Drive contributes to the nineteenth century ambience.

== Heritage listing ==
Cook Terrace was listed on the Queensland Heritage Register on 21 October 1992 having satisfied the following criteria.

The place is important in demonstrating the evolution or pattern of Queensland's history.

Completed in 1889, Cook Terrace provides evidence of the 1880s boom era confidence in Brisbane.

The place demonstrates rare, uncommon or endangered aspects of Queensland's cultural heritage.

Cook Terrace is substantially intact, including attached timber service wings which are rare, and survives as one of few nineteenth century terraces in Brisbane.

The continuation of the masonry party walls above the roof line, is an uncommon type of construction in attached row housing in Brisbane.

The place is important in demonstrating the principal characteristics of a particular class of cultural places.

Cook Terrace is substantially intact, including attached timber service wings which are rare, and survives as one of few nineteenth century terraces in Brisbane.

The place is important because of its aesthetic significance.

Cook Terrace is prominently located fronting Coronation Drive, and contributes to the Coronation Drive riverscape and streetscape.

The place has a strong or special association with a particular community or cultural group for social, cultural or spiritual reasons.

Cook Terrace is a local landmark and has a strong association for the people of Brisbane with Milton history, both 19th century and more recent 20th century, particularly when Cook Terrace was converted to flats and attracted a student clientele in the 1960s and 1970s.
