= North Quay, Brisbane =

Street in Brisbane, Queensland

Coordinates: 27°28′08.34″S 153°01′09″E

North Quay
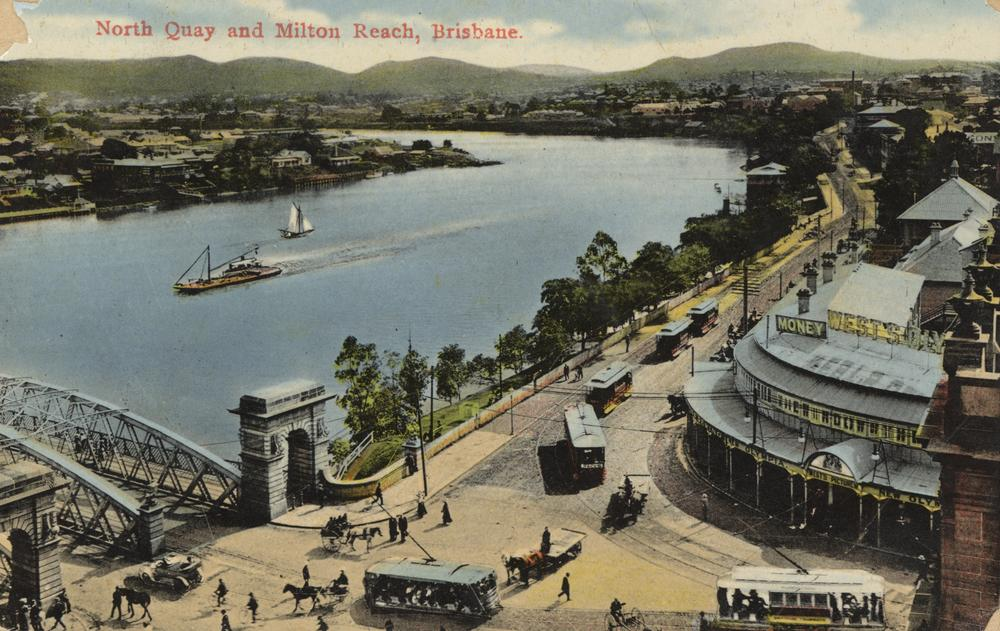
- An old photo of North Quay, coloured for a postcard
- Interactive map of North Quay
- Location: Brisbane central business district
- South-east end: Queen Street
- Major junctions: Queen Street; Adelaide Street; Ann Street; Riverside Expressway; Turbot Street; Tank Street; Herschel Street; Makerston Street; Saul Street / William Jolly Bridge
- North-west end: Saul Street / William Jolly Bridge
- East: George Street / Roma Street
- West: Riverside Expressway

North Quay is an area of the Brisbane central business district in Queensland, Australia, and a street of the same name, running along the northern bank of the Brisbane River from Eagle Terrace to William Street, linking the William Jolly Bridge and Victoria Bridge. It was the site of Brisbane’s first settlement, where a stream from Spring Hill provided fresh water, later collected in a reservoir on Tank Street.

== Location ==
The precise bounds of this small locality are debatable. By one opinion, it is about seven blocks long, covering the northerly bank of the Brisbane River between the Victoria Bridge and the William Jolly Bridge; another opinion gives it roughly the area of four city blocks in length, from Ann Street north of Brisbane Square to Queens Gardens, including the Conrad Treasury Casino. By either opinion it is little more than a single block in width, extending North only to George Street and Roma Street.

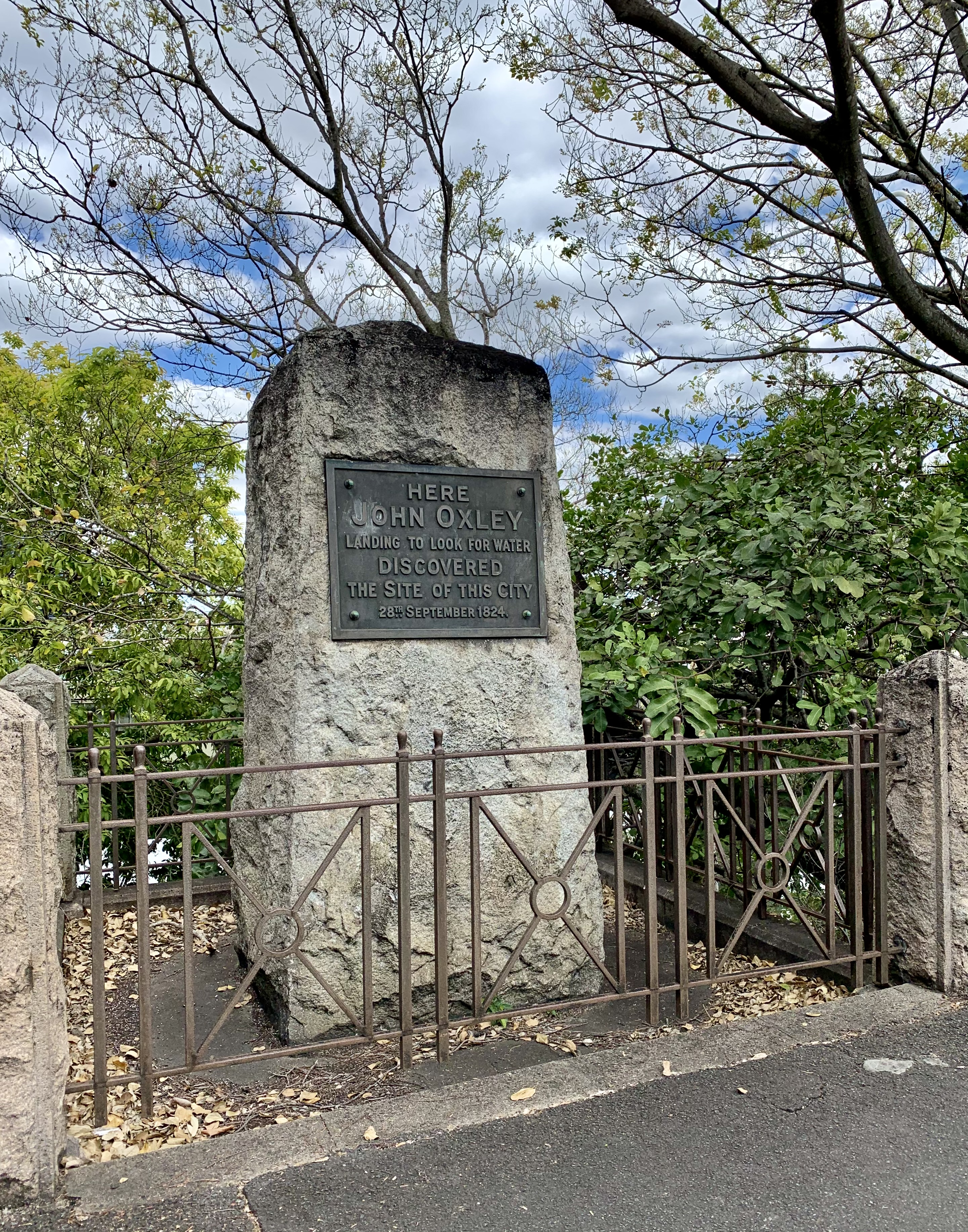
Monument to commemorate the landing of John Oxley in 1823

The location has an historical record in Queensland because it was a landing point during the first European exploration of the river in 1823 and later in 1825, the Moreton Bay penal colony at Redcliffe relocated here, establishing the first permanent European settlement in what was to become the state of Queensland.

Captain Henry Miller was responsible for the settlement transfer, which was due to armed resistance by local Aboriginal groups, biting insects and a lack of reliable fresh water at Redcliffe. Although North Quay is most likely not the exact location selected by John Oxley and Sir Thomas Brisbane during scouting expeditions in November 1824, the high banks at North Quay proved to be highly suitable, well above the flood levels that plagued Brisbane in subsequent years.

A riverside bikeway leading to the University of Queensland and the western suburbs from the Victoria Bridge has been built on the river at North Quay.

== Legal Precinct ==
North Quay was historically and remains the centre of Queensland's legal infrastructure:

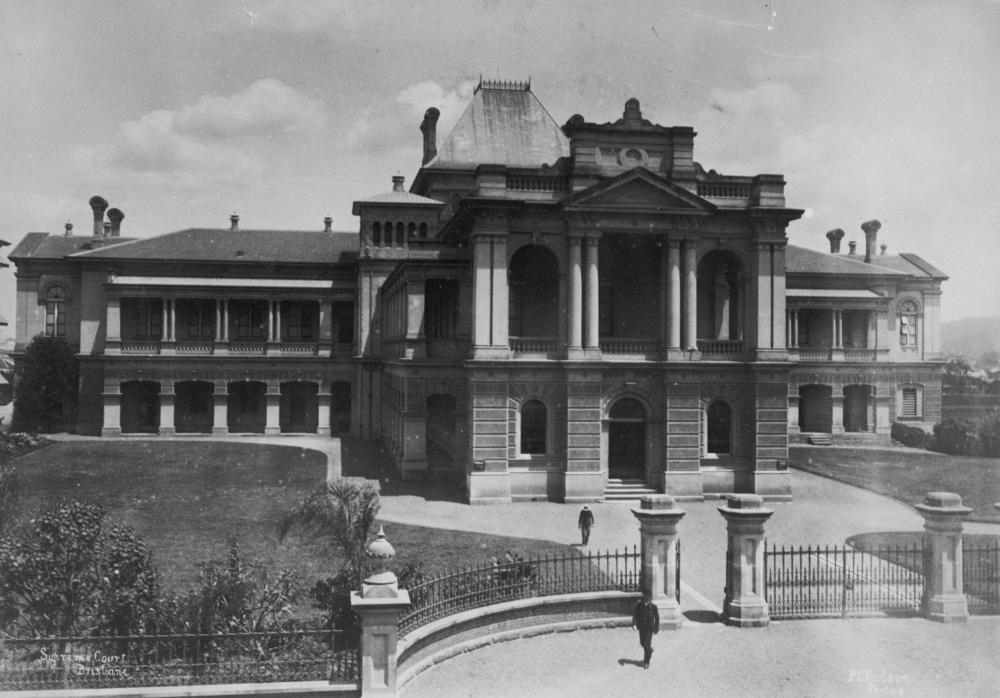
Supreme Court building, Brisbane, Queensland Supreme Court viewed from North Quay, 1891

- From 1879 to 2012, the Supreme Court of Queensland was located in the block bounded by North Quay, Ann Street, George Street and Adelaide Street.
- Diagonally opposite, State Government legal offices, including the Department of Justice and Attorney General, the Crown Law Office and the office of the Director of Public Prosecutions, are located in the State Law Building at the intersection of Ann Street and George Street.
- The Brisbane home of the Federal judiciary is located in the Harry Gibbs Commonwealth Law Courts Building, which fronts North Quay between Turbot Street and Tank Street.
- The Inns of Court – the purpose-built home of the Queensland Bar – also fronts North Quay, situated on the opposite side of Turbot Street.
- The headquarters of the Queensland Police Service is located at the intersection of Roma Street and Makerston Street.
- Since 2004, the Brisbane Magistrates Court building has occupied a triangular block bounded by George, Roma, and Turbot Streets, to which was added in 2012 the Queen Elizabeth II Courts of Law to house the relocated Supreme and District Courts of Queensland.

== Street ==
The road can be congested on week days with traffic from Coronation Drive using part of the street to enter the city. The road also feeds traffic on to the Riverside Expressway, one end of the Pacific Motorway.

Towards the easterly end, North Quay leads into William Street and the government precinct further east along the river. Since 2021, works associated with construction of the Adelaide Street tunnel connexion to the King George Square busway station have created chaotic traffic conditions, especially during peak commuting times, along North Quay between Ann street and the Victoria Bridge, also affecting the southern end of Adelaide Street from its intersection with George Street. The lack of alternative routes, combined with poor site planning, results in gridlock conditions on a daily basis.

== Heritage listings ==
North Quay has a number of heritage-listed sites, including:

- Sections of Albert St, George St, William St, North Quay, Queen's Wharf Rd: Early Streets of Brisbane
- Coronation Drive: Coronation Drive retaining wall
- 273 North Quay: First Church of Christ, Scientist
- William Street: William Street retaining wall

== Major intersections ==
- Queen Street
- Adelaide Street
- Ann Street
- Riverside Expressway
- Turbot Street
- Tank Street
- Herschel Street
- Makerston Street
- Saul Street / William Jolly Bridge

== See also ==
- Northbank (Brisbane)
- North Quay 1 & 2 Ferry Wharf
