= Riverside Expressway =

Motorway in Brisbane, Australia

Riverside Expressway Pacific Motorway Queensland
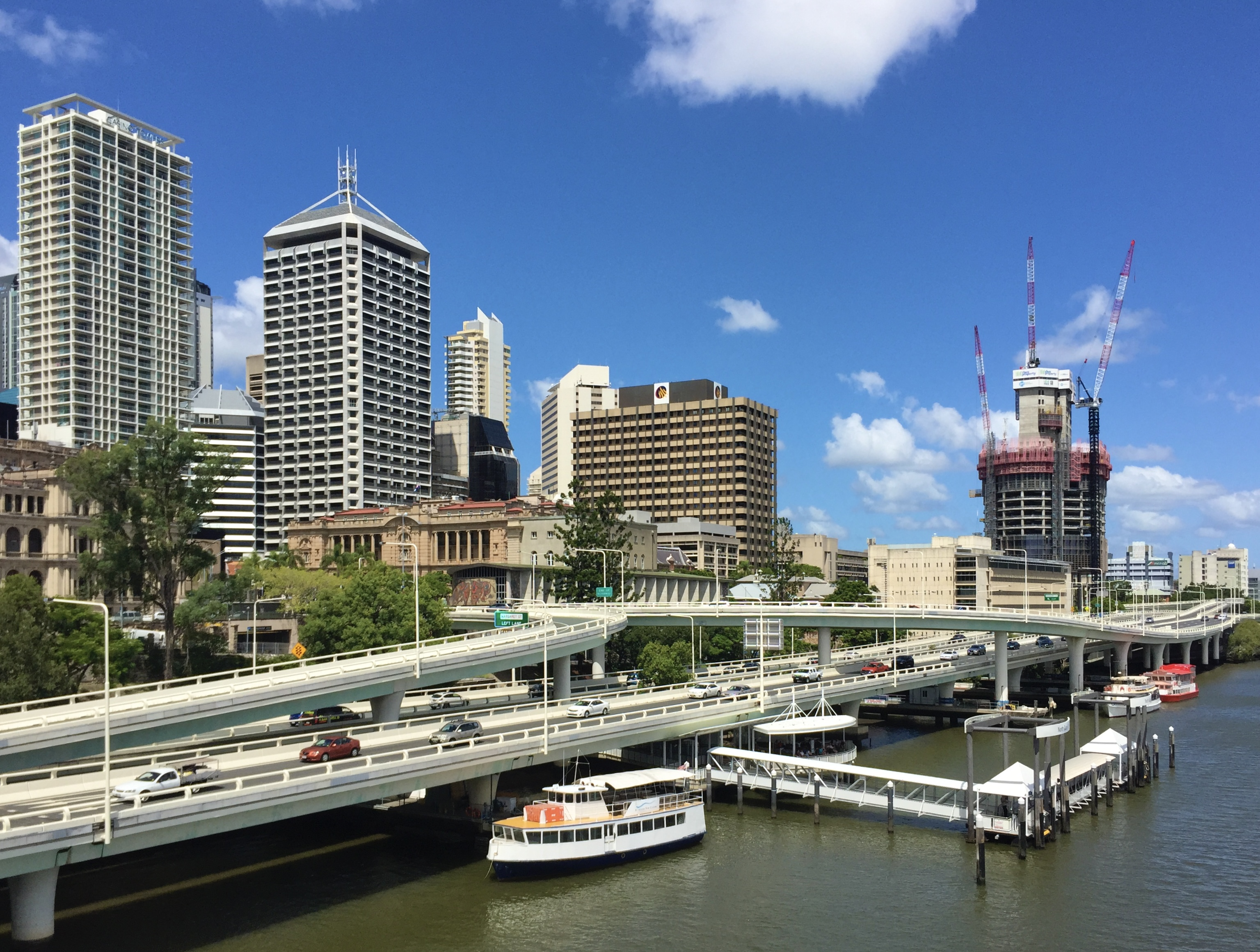

General information
- Type: Expressway
- Length: 2 km (1.2 mi)
- Route number(s): M3
- Former route number: Metroad 3

Major junctions
- North end: Coronation Drive; Brisbane City
- South end: Pacific Motorway (Captain Cook Bridge); Brisbane City

Highway system
- Highways in Australia; National Highway • Freeways in Australia; Highways in Queensland

The Riverside Expressway is an elevated section of the Pacific Motorway that runs through Brisbane, Queensland, Australia. It is located on the western side of the Brisbane CBD and is made up of various bridges and flyovers. The North Bank development was formerly proposed to alleviate the visual disruption of the expressway and recapture the riverfront for pedestrians.

The Expressway runs the entire western length of the Brisbane CBD from Coronation Drive to the Captain Cook Bridge at Gardens Point, an estimated distance of 3 kilometres (1.9 mi), before becoming the Pacific Motorway, which ends at the Gold Coast.

The roadway has been described as a concrete barrier on the river's edge and an eyesore. However, others have praised the dramatic and visually arresting views of the Brisbane River, skyline and surrounds experienced by drivers and passengers on the elevated expressway.

== Congestion ==
Traffic congestion in the central city area became problematic in the late 1950s and 1960s. The Story Bridge, William Jolly Bridge and Victoria Bridge were clogged with traffic wanting to cross from one side of town to the other. A traffic engineering company called Wilbur Smith and Associates was asked to study Brisbane's traffic problems by the state government. They delivered a report, the Brisbane Transportation Study, which included plans for traffic management for many years.

In 2016, the road was the most congested in the state with average traffic speeds in afternoon peak times slowing to 19 km per hour.

== History ==
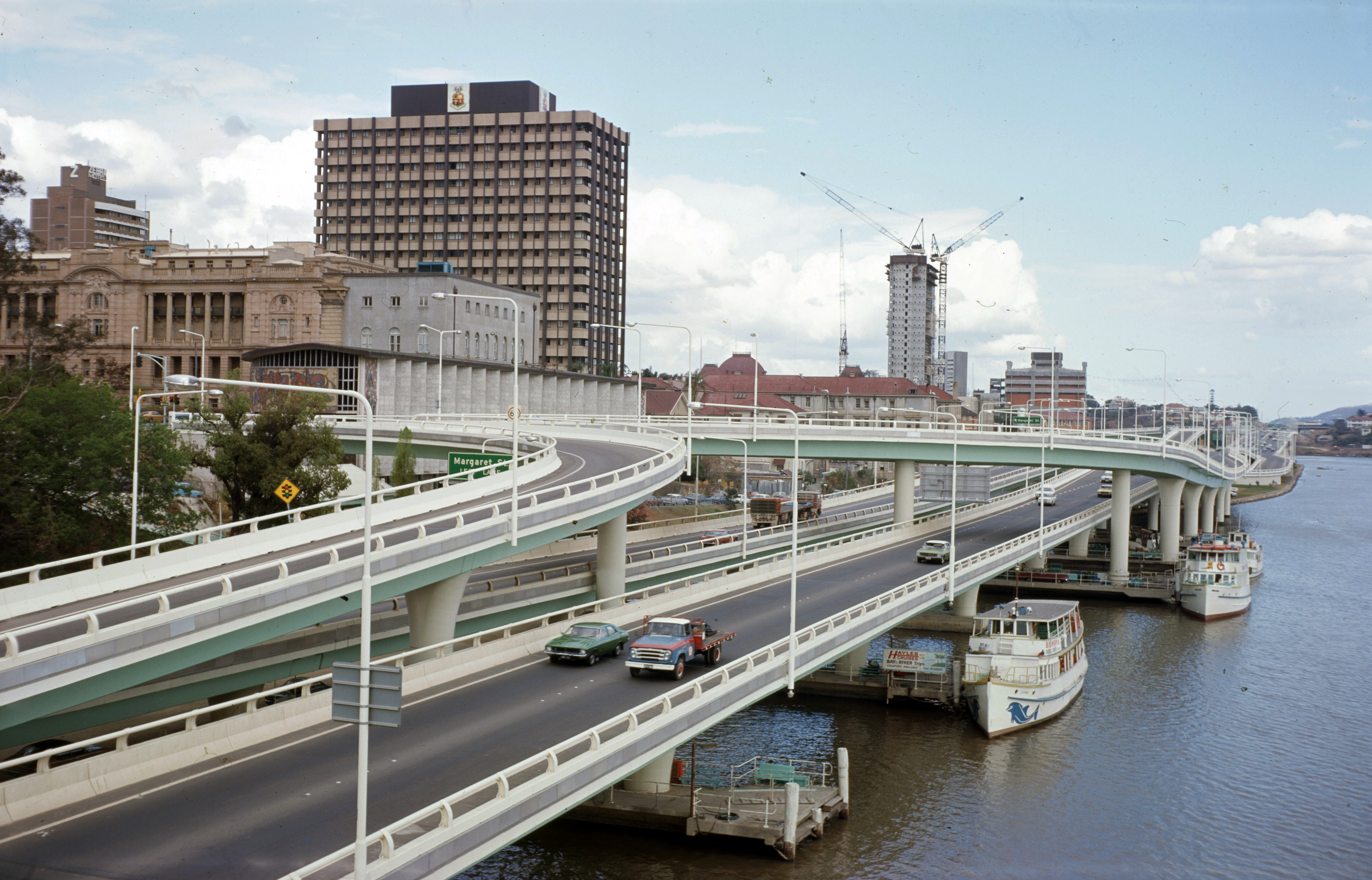
Riverside Expressway, 1977

Construction on the Riverside Expressway began in late 1968, when the pylons for the bridge were laid on the north bank of the Brisbane River. It was built over the former Short Street which provided access to a wharf. The bridge was completed in 1975 as was the Southeast Freeway to Holland Park West. The Brisbane River was used as a source for gravel to make much of the concrete used in construction. The freeway was opened on 22 July 1976 by Governor Sir Colin Hannah.

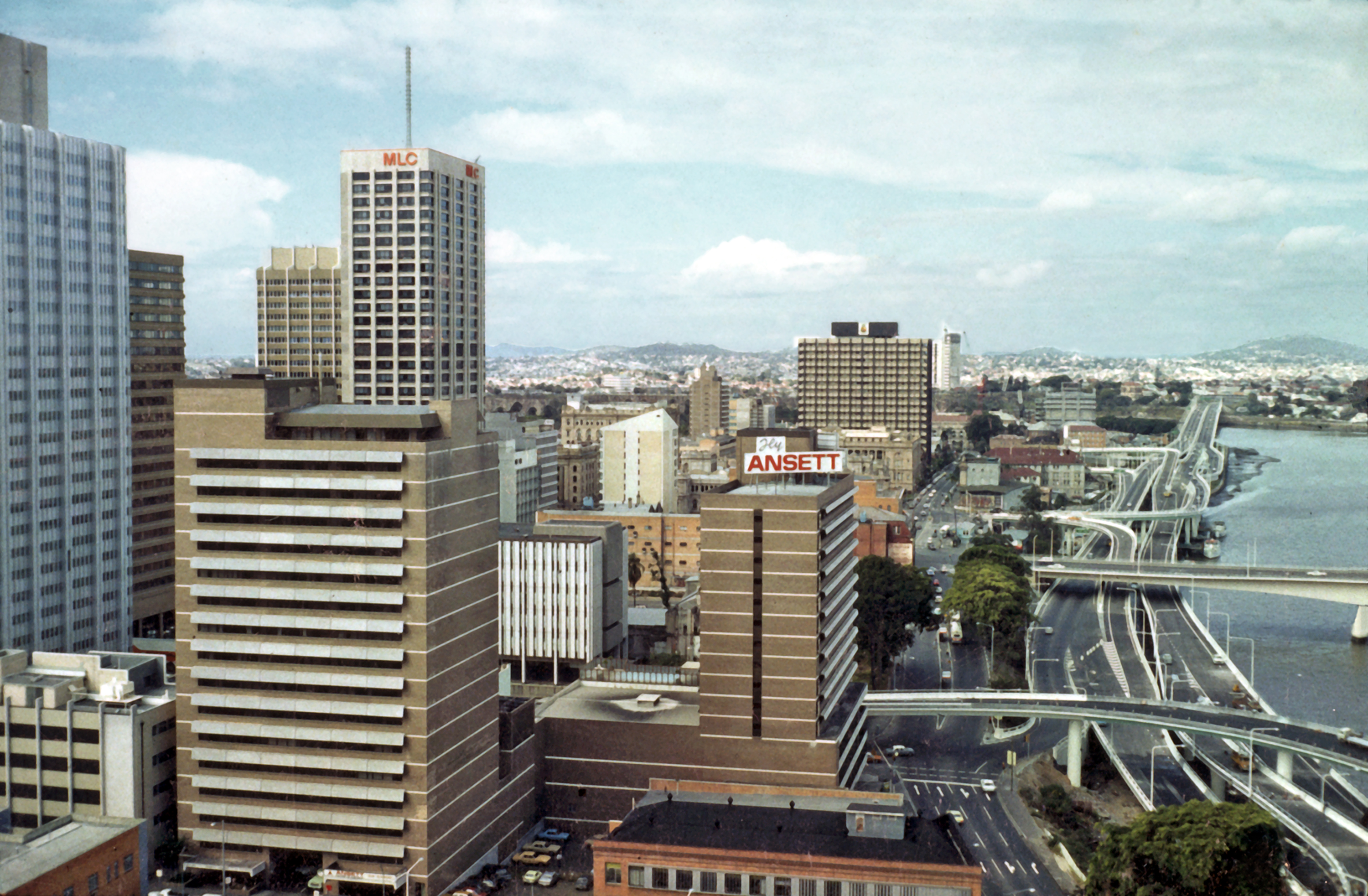
Brisbane central business district and the Riverside Expressway over the Brisbane River, circa 1980

The development of the Expressway necessitated an increase in Turbot Street's capacity as an arterial road, so the street was widened.

In 2018, a three car accident at Greenslopes caused around a 10 km traffic delay including the whole of the Riverside Expressway.

In February 2021, Extinction Rebellion staged a protest on the roadway at the Turbot Street offramp.

=== 2006 appearance of cracks ===
During September and October 2006, roadworks occurred on the Expressway, and surrounding structures, including the Captain Cook Bridge. Maintenance on these structures had not been done for more than 30 years since its construction in the early 1970s. On 17 October 2006, parts of the expressway were closed due to safety concerns regarding hairline cracks in the Alice Street and Ann St ramps.

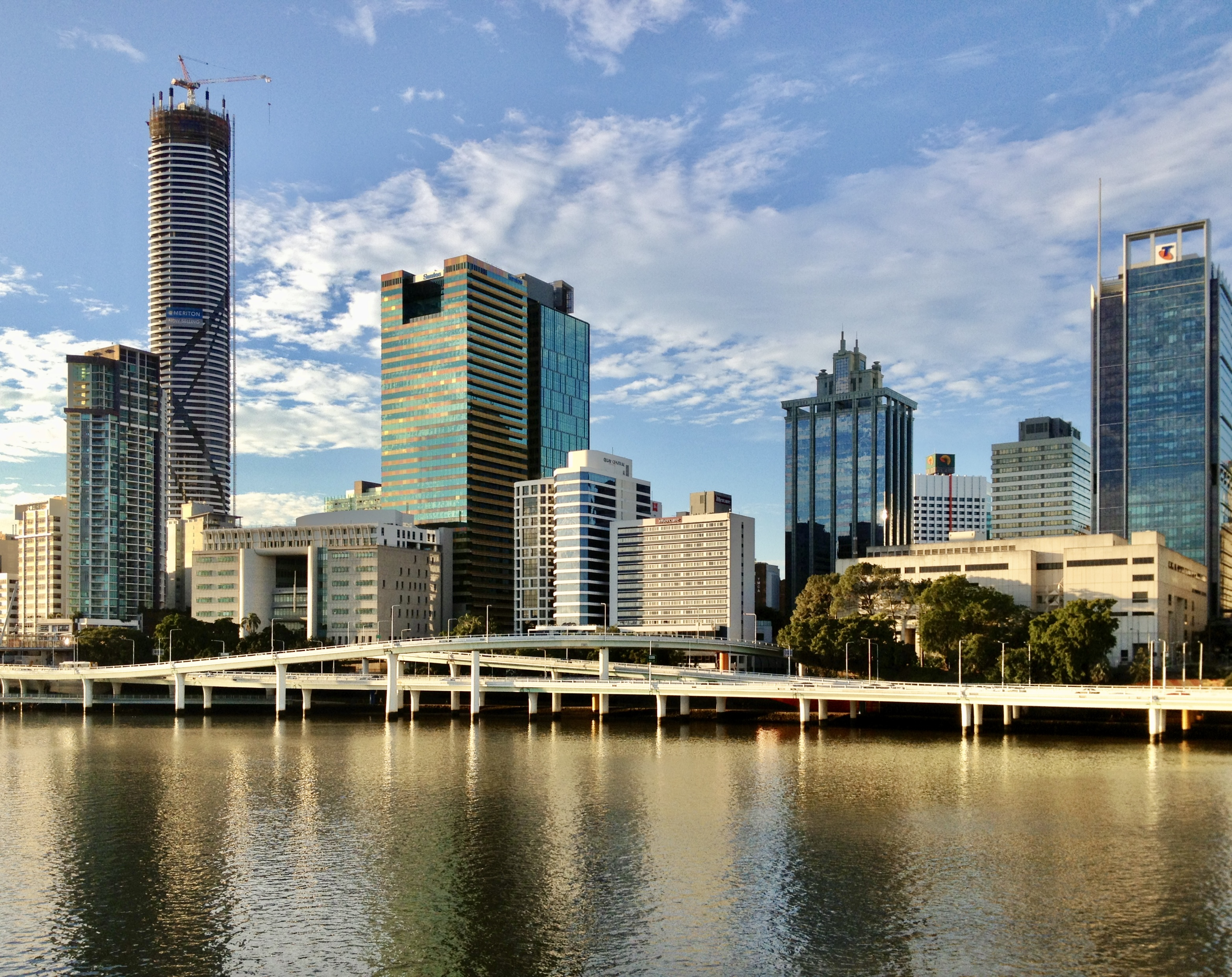
The Riverside Expressway runs parallel to the Brisbane River and George Street.

The initial conclusion reached by engineers is that the hairline fracture, measuring over 2 metres long and 0.4 mm wide, was caused by the stress on the structure due to "The weight of both ramps is [now] balanced on one bearing and they are failing to shift their weight to their other bearings as designed."

This road closure caused widespread delays for motorists travelling through the inner city. Public transport facilities were heavily utilised to travel to work at peak periods. Business activity in the Brisbane central business district was affected by a dramatic reduction in customers as shoppers avoided the area.

On 20 October 2006, Department of Main Roads workers successfully drove a 22 tonne truck up and down the Ann Street ramp deeming the ramp to have passed a weight test. The main section of the Expressway was reopened, except for the Alice St and Ann St ramps. A few days later the ramps were completely reopened to all but heavy vehicles.

== Major intersections and crossings ==
At the northern end the road start where North Quay ends at the intersection with Herschel Street. Nearby the road is crossed by the Kurilpa Bridge. Entrance and exits are provided for both Turbot Street and Ann Street. The Riverside Expressway is then crossed by the Victoria Bridge. Further south there are entrances and exits for Elizabeth Street, Margaret Street and Alice Street.

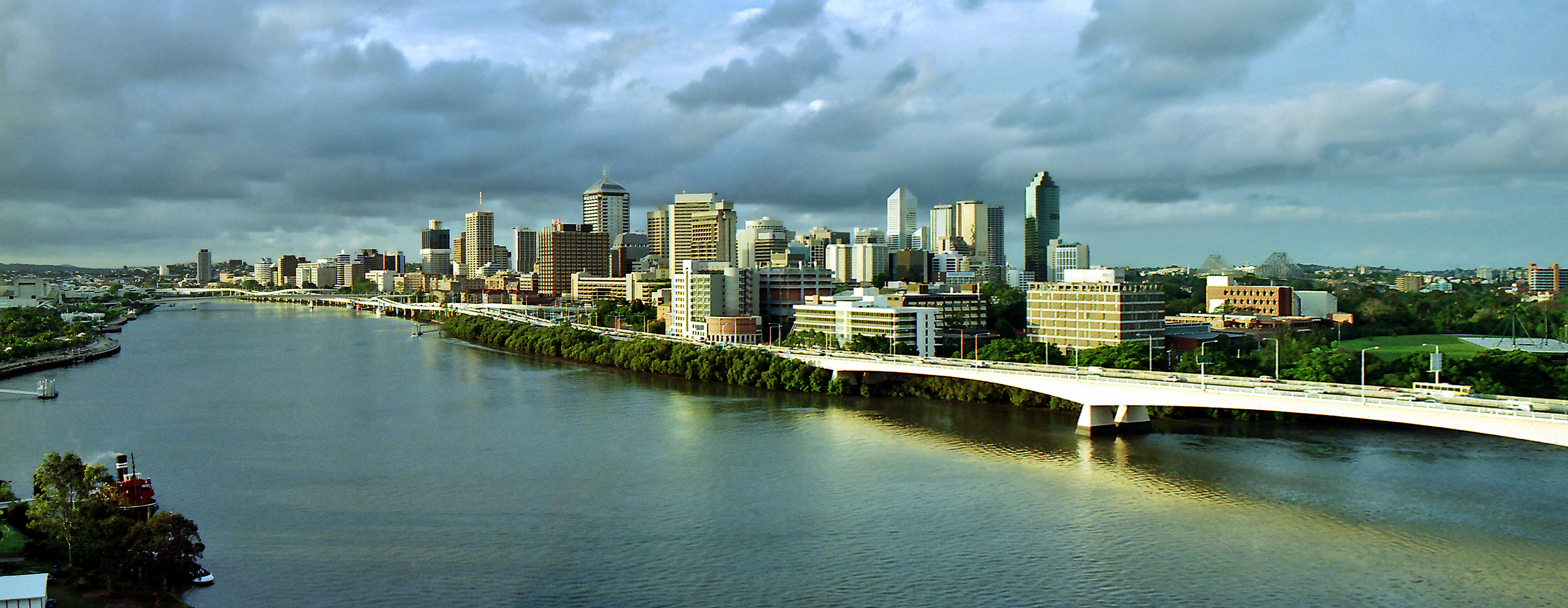
Panorama of Brisbane in Oct 1995 with the Riverside Expressway on the right side.

== See also ==
- Freeways in Australia
- Freeways in Brisbane
