= McDonnell & East Ltd Building =

Heritage-listed building in Brisbane, Queensland

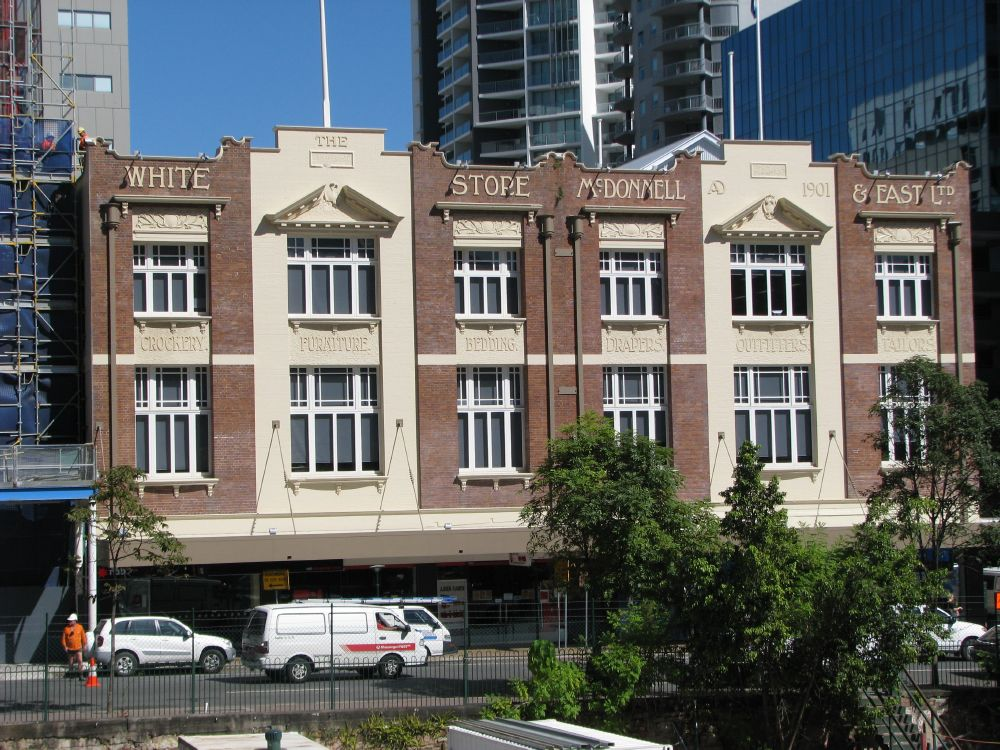
- McDonnell & East Ltd Building, 2008

- Location within Queensland Location within Australia
- 27.4683°S 153.0205°E
- Location: 414 George Street, Brisbane, Queensland, Australia

History
- Design period: 1900–1914 (early 20th century)
- Built: 1912–1928

Site notes
- Architect: Thomas Ramsay Hall
- Architectural style: Arts & Crafts

Queensland Heritage Register
- Official name: McDonnell & East Ltd Building
- Type: state heritage (built)
- Designated: 10 December 1997
- Reference no.: 600120
- Significant period: 1912, 1914, 1925–1928 (fabric); 1931–1990, 1984 (historical)
- Builders: Andrew Gillespie

McDonnell & East Ltd Building is a heritage-listed former department store at 414 George Street, Brisbane, Queensland, Australia. It was designed by Thomas Ramsay Hall and built from 1912 to 1928 by Andrew Gillespie. It was added to the Queensland Heritage Register on 10 December 1997.

== History ==
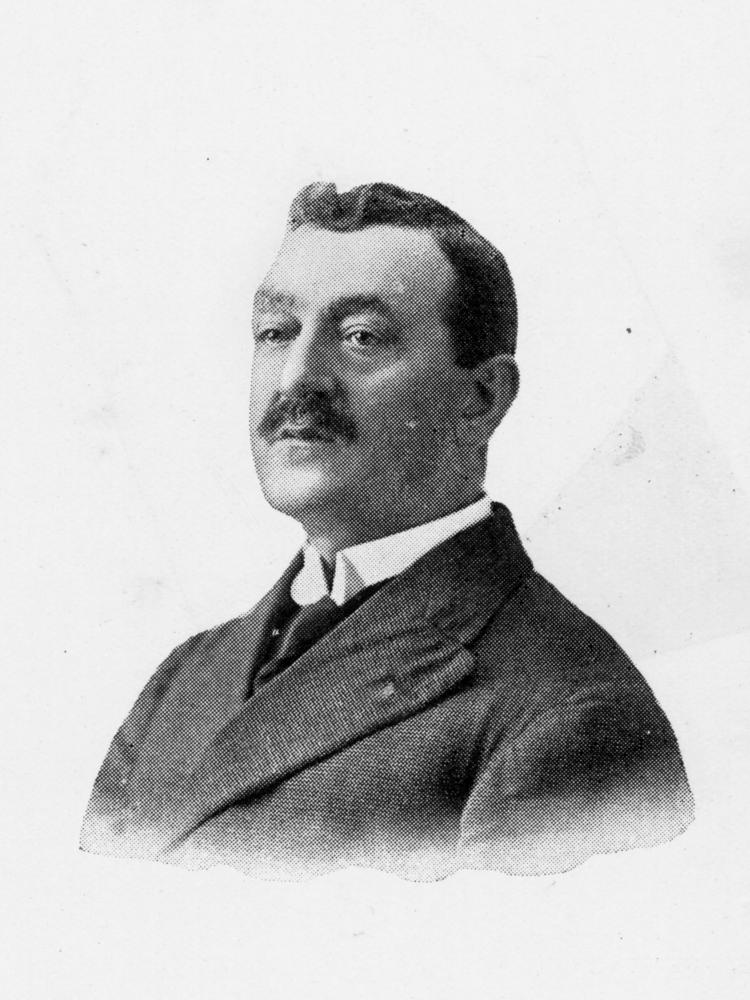
Frank McDonnell, 1924

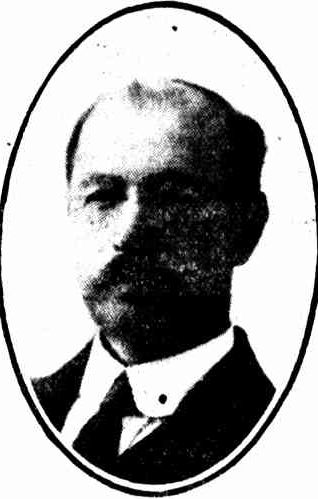
Hubert East

This three-storeyed brick department store building was erected in several stages between 1912 and 1963, for the Brisbane firm of McDonnell & East Ltd.

In 1886, Irishmen Frank McDonnell and Hubert East emigrated to Brisbane, where they were employed in the drapery trade. From 1889, McDonnell was closely connected with the movement for the early closing of shops. He entered Queensland Legislative Assembly in 1896 as the Labour member for Fortitude Valley, and largely due to his efforts, early closing was introduced in 1900.

In October 1901, the firm of McDonnell & East Ltd was established and, with the financial backing of businessman and publican Peter Murphy, owner of the Transcontinental Hotel, the firm purchased John Reid's drapery business, and the lease of the premises, at 402–408 George Street.

Within six years McDonnell & East Ltd was well established as a firm of importers, cash drapers, tailors, outfitters, dressmakers and milliners. About 1908, Jack McDonnell and Fraser and Harry East, sons of the founders, entered the firm.

In 1911, McDonnell & East Ltd acquired the adjoining George Street allotments to the corner of Tank Street, and in October 1911 Brisbane architect Thomas Ramsay Hall called tenders for a new brick building. The contract was let to Andrew Gillespie with a price of £10,734, which included electrical fittings, counter, fixtures and passenger lift. Construction began in January 1912, and the new building, advertised as the White Store, was occupied in April 1913. The company continued to lease the original building.

Following the success of the White Store, which doubled profits within a year, the company purchased a contiguous block in Tank Street, behind the new showrooms, in 1913. In mid-1914 TR Hall again called tenders for a store for McDonnell & East Ltd, and the contract was let to New Farm builder Mark Doggett, with a price of £1,310. This building was completed late in 1914, but it is not clear whether it remains as part of the present complex.

The business flourished, assisted by the re-location of the Brisbane Markets to Roma Street in 1915, and the proximity of the tram stops in George Street and the Roma Street railway station, which brought custom. McDonnell & East Ltd became a public company in 1920.

Between c. 1917 and 1921, McDonnell & East Ltd acquired another three adjacent sites: a property in Turbot Street; the allotment occupied by the original George Street store; and a laneway running in from Tank Street, which was closed in exchange for the company's creating a laneway in from Turbot Street.

In the mid-1920s, architects Thomas Ramsay Hall and George Gray Prentice designed substantial three-storeyed extensions for these sites. The work was carried out by contractor Francis Joseph Corbett, who started in late 1925 and finished in March 1928. The original leased premises, fronting George Street, were demolished and replaced with a three-storeyed extension of the 1912 building. A separate but adjoining three-storeyed building was erected on the Tank Street sites. The extensions conformed with the 1912 street elevations, and featured the latest fittings, elevators and modern conveniences. At the same time, new shop fronts were installed in the corner building by contractors Robertson & Corbett. The founders of the firm just lived to see the extensions completed: Hubert East died in May 1928, and Frank McDonnell followed him six months later. Fraser East and Jack McDonnell took over as joint managing directors.

The renovations and extensions, which cost approximately £35,000, immediately boosted the status of McDonnell & East Ltd and George Street as a trading centre. The design allowed for further additions in Tank Street, but the Great Depression and World War II thwarted this proposal.

The George Street Post Office was located in the McDonnell & East Ltd building from 27 July 1931 until 28 September 1990. The area was let to the Postmaster-General's Department (PMG) free of charge for the first ten years, with the fittings supplied by the store. The office was staffed by PMG personnel.

After the Second World War business flourished once again, and by 1967 McDonnell & East Ltd had purchased all the property fronting Tank Street to North Quay; all the allotments facing North Quay up to, but excluding, the church at the corner of Turbot Street; and another allotment fronting Turbot Street. The site in Tank Street adjoining the 1928 building was acquired in 1950. It contained a two-storeyed building, into which McDonnell & East Ltd expanded. In 1960 this building was reconstructed as a three-storeyed extension of the McDonnell & East Ltd store. No attempt was made to design a street facade to conform with the 1912–1928 building.

A large, free customer car park, occupying most of the remainder of McDonnell & East Ltd's property at the rear of the store, was constructed in stages between about 1956 and 1969. This no longer survives.

Substantial renovations were carried out in the 1960s: the street level windows were remodelled in 1960; a number of small buildings at the rear of the store were demolished and replaced with a three-storeyed extension, creating an L-shape, in 1963; and in 1964 all remaining dividing walls on the three levels were removed. The Queensland Room Coffee Lounge and Gallery was opened in 1965, and won an international award for a community service project in a retail store.

In 1984, McDonnell & East Ltd was taken over by an investment group, but the family name was retained. The sale of its fashion and homewares businesses meant that this particular company's well known city/suburban set up had shifted from a middle market positioning to a vision of an upmarket department store chain in direct competition with national interstate-based chains like Myer, David Jones and Waltons targeting large population centres in Queensland. The chain's 1980s over-expansion and the ever-growing dominance of the department stores duopoly beating out the Queensland-based department store chain landed the chain at the end of the decade in a position where it couldn't compete with its national counterparts and in financial difficulties by 1990 and its de-listing by its investment company that saw the decline of the Brisbane-based retail empire, and the Garden City Upper Mount Gravatt (opened 1970), the now-defunct Westfield Shoppingtown Toombul (opened 1984 and closed by 1987, on the site of a former Barry & Roberts store, and replacing the original Target store in that location which had closed in 1982), Rockhampton Shopping Fair (opened 1985), Nerang Street Mall Southport (opened 1986), Surfers Paradise's Holiday City Galleria store (also opened 1986), Toowoomba (Pigott's Building) (acquired 1983) and Warwick (acquired 1983) stores closed by January 1991. The George Street (the chain's original flagship city store, opened 1901), Pacific Fair (opened 1977) and Ipswich (opened 1987) stores - as well as its sister Queensland-based Pikes] menswear - it acquired in 1975 -, Britches jeanswear and New Trend curtain and wallpaper chains initially survived, although they were subsequently downsized (the Ipswich store in particular became a 'glorified' fashion boutique before closing in 1993), and closed altogether in March 1994 (after closing in Pacific Fair a few months earlier).

The building was reported to be derelict in 2004, when a man was found trapped in the building, having suffered serious injuries after falling down a lift well. The accident resulted in Lord Mayor Campbell Newman ordering inspections of all the empty buildings in Brisbane's inner city.

In late 2005, the building was bought by De Martini and John Fletcher Properties Group and Rohrig Constructios for $8.38 million. It was redeveloped with retail spaces fronting George Street and Tank Street, and office space throughout the remainder of the building. The redevelopment won an Australian Property Institute excellence in property award for heritage property in 2007, and Rio Tinto leased most of the new office space as the building's anchor tenant. In December 2007, the building was sold to Lendlease for more than $45 million.

== Description ==
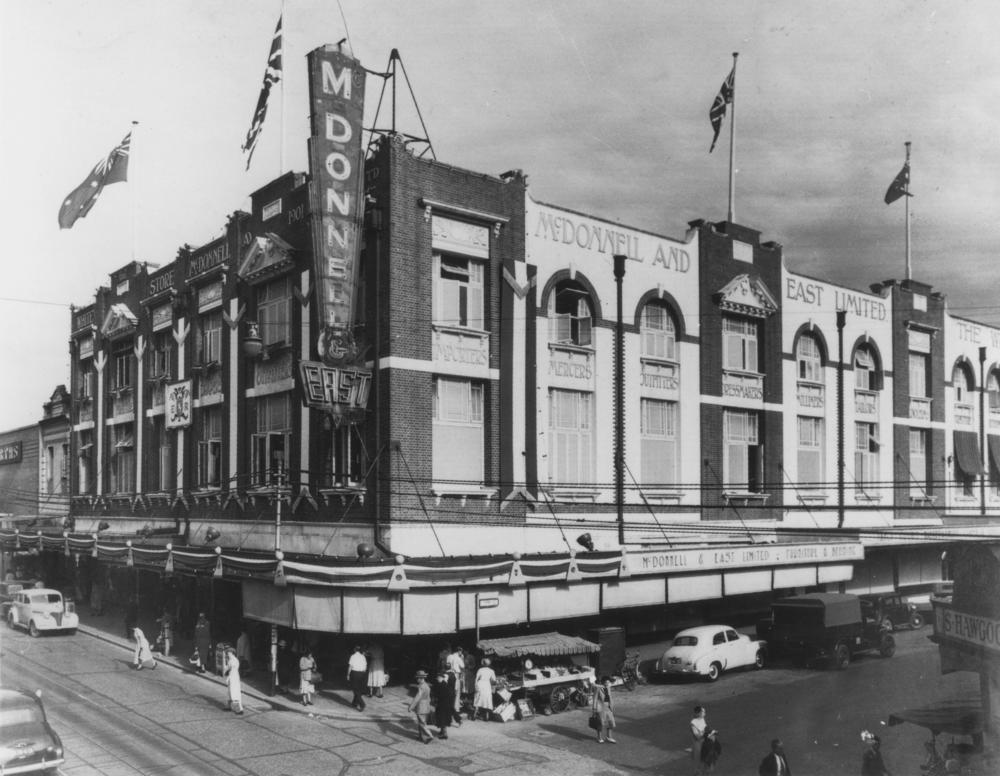
McDonnell and East department store, circa 1950

The building is three storeys high with a basement. It combines characteristics of many of the styles from the first quarter of the century. It has a Federation red brick and stucco facade and Art Nouveau lettering. The detailing reflects both the Arts and Crafts and Art Nouveau styles.

The building is of red brick with stucco render originally painted cream. The George Street facade has since been painted beige and its details picked out in a deep green. The George Street facade has six window bays and is divided into two equal sections of three. The central bay of each section has a pediment above its upper-level window. All the windows on the George Street frontage have had the glazing painted over in the same colour as the walls with frames painted green.

The Tank Street frontage retains its alternating red brick and white rendered bays. There are four brick sections, which contain individual window bays. The first two rendered sections have two window bays while the end section has four. The upper-level windows in the rendered bays have semi-circular arched openings, with three courses of unrendered brick above them for emphasis. All the windows in the rendered sections are grouped in pairs that are separated by unrendered bands of brick that have their bonding pattern picked out. White painted downpipes run down the wall in these locations.

Raised lettering with the name of the store and the goods it provided are a feature of both facades. There are raised sections of parapet centred over each pediment on the George Street facade and above each unrendered brick bay on the Tank Street facade. Flagpoles are located behind each raised section of parapet. A small curved portion flanks the sides of each raised parapet. The facade has protruding sills supported on decorative stucco brackets and similar hood moulds over the upper-level windows.

Internally the original pressed metal remains above the modular suspended ceilings. This is completely exposed in the basement level and in some store rooms.

The building has suffered from the addition of modern shopfronts, the removal of the original awning and the painting of the George Street facade, but still contributes greatly to the streetscapes of both George and Tank Streets.

== Heritage listing ==
McDonnell & East Ltd Building was listed on the Queensland Heritage Register on 10 December 1997 having satisfied the following criteria.

The place is important in demonstrating the evolution or pattern of Queensland's history.

The McDonnell & East Ltd Building is important in contributing to the evolution of upper George Street as a commercial precinct, aided by the establishment of the markets and transportation and the financial investments of businessman and publican Peter Murphy.

The place is important in demonstrating the principal characteristics of a particular class of cultural places.

The McDonnell & East Ltd Building is important in demonstrating the principal characteristics of an early 20th century department store, including the incorporation of advertising into the facade to illustrate the building's function.

The place is important because of its aesthetic significance.

The McDonnell & East Ltd Building is important in exhibiting a range of aesthetic characteristics valued by the community, in particular the quality of the street elevations, with the stepped parapet, ornamental detail and lettering, and paired window openings which give the facades a rhythmic quality.

The place has a special association with the life or work of a particular person, group or organisation of importance in Queensland's history.

The building has a special association with the Brisbane firm of McDonnell & East Ltd and their contribution to the development of a department store culture in Brisbane in the early 20th century. The McDonnell & East Ltd Building also has special association with influential Brisbane architects TR Hall and GG Prentice, as an example of their commercial work.
