= Daniel Marques =

Daniel Marques may refer to:

- Daniel Marques (Brazilian footballer) (born 1983), Brazilian football centre-back
- Daniel Marques (Portuguese footballer) (born 1987), Portuguese football defender

== See also ==
- Daniel Marquis (1829–1879), Australian photographer
- Daniel Márquez (born 1987), Mexican football forward
