= 500 George Street, Brisbane =

500 George Street
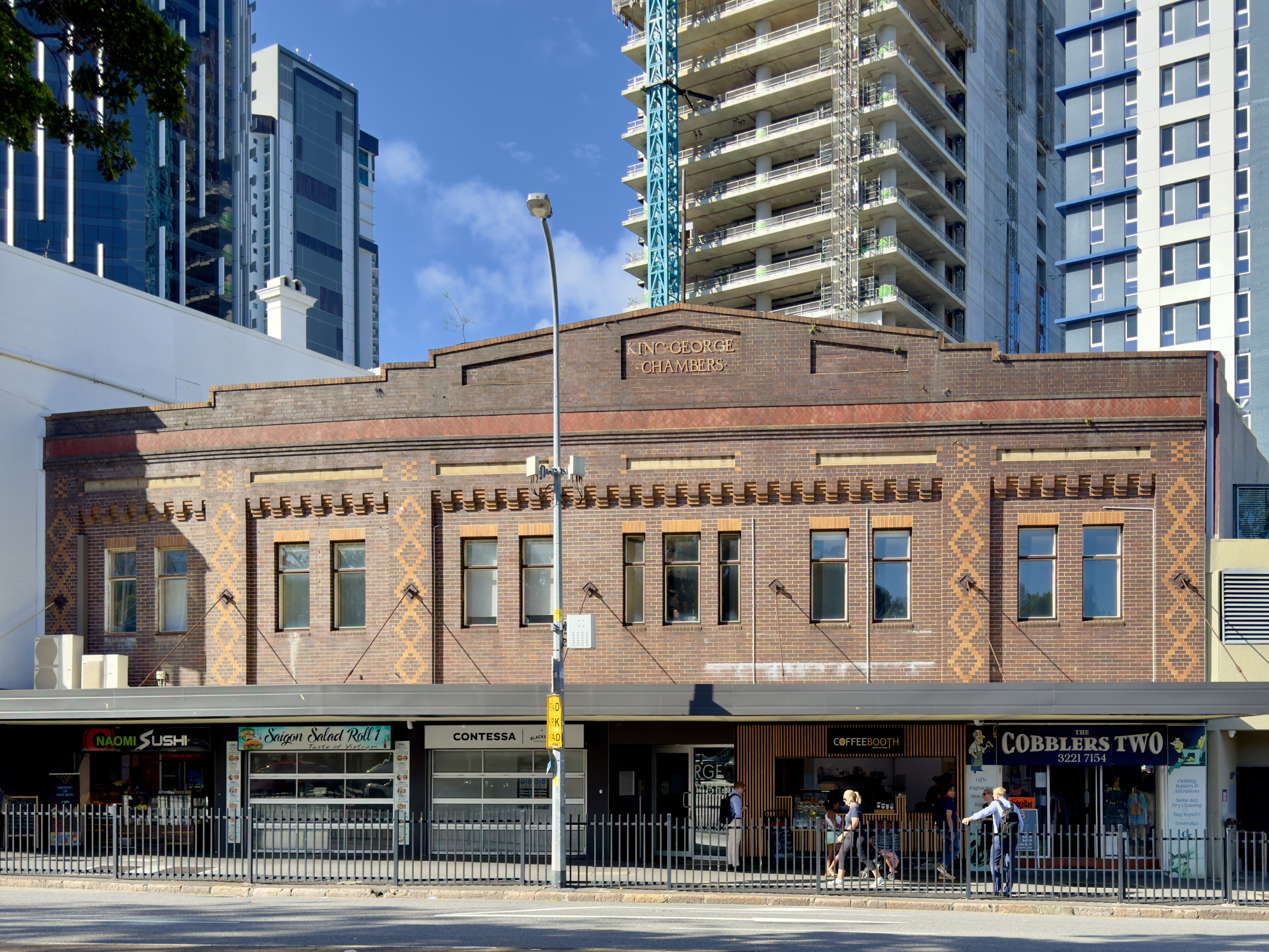
- King George Chambers building in 2024
- Interactive map of the 500 George Street area

General information
- Status: Proposed
- Type: Residential
- Location: Brisbane, Australia, 500 George Street
- Coordinates: 27.466971°S 153.01928°E

Height
- Height: 191 metres (627 ft)

Technical details
- Floor count: 60
- Floor area: 26,103 m^{2} (280,970 sq ft)

Design and construction
- Architect: Cottee Parker Architects
- Developer: Nielson Properties

The 500 George Street is a proposed residential skyscraper to be located at 500 George Street in Brisbane, Australia. The building comprises 144 serviced apartments and student accommodation from level 8 to 25 as well as 248 one and two bedroom residential apartments from level 26 to 56. A full floor resident's sky pool and terrace will be located on level 58. The development involves the retention of the historic King George Chambers building at the front of the site as a foyer and the main pedestrian access point to the new tower.

Development application was lodged with the Brisbane City Council in June 2015.

== See also ==
- List of tallest buildings in Brisbane
