= Hunters Buildings =

Heritage-listed buildings in Brisbane, Queensland

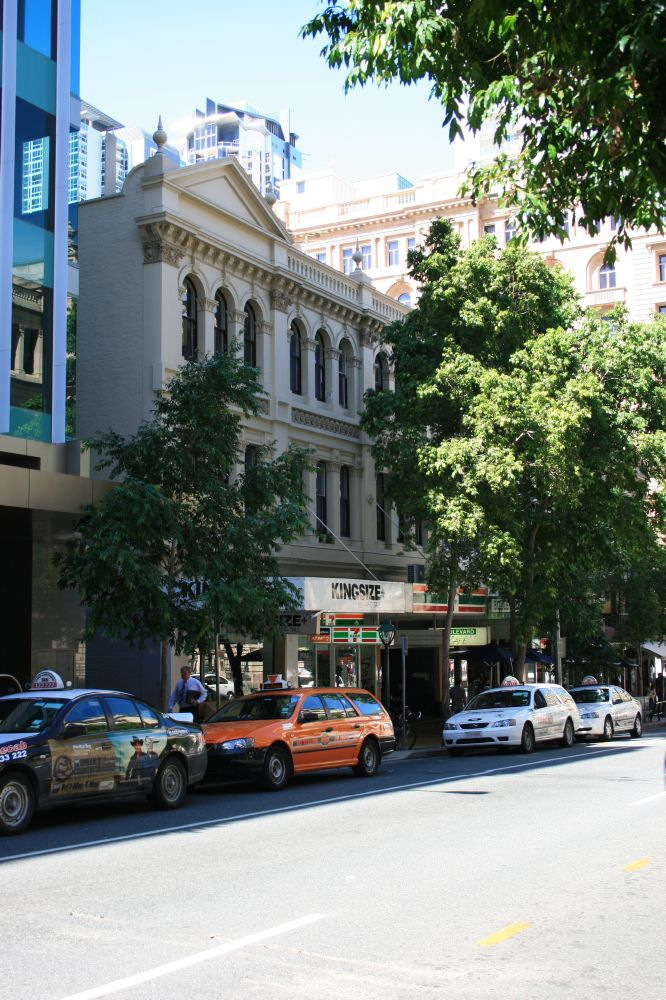
- Treasury Chambers (George Street), 2009

- Location within Queensland Location within Australia
- 27.4713°S 153.0243°E
- Location: 179–191 George Street, Brisbane City, City of Brisbane, Queensland, Australia

History
- Built: 1886
- Built for: James Hunter

Site notes
- Architect: Richard Gailey

Queensland Heritage Register
- Official name: Treasury Chambers & St Francis House & Symons Building
- Type: state heritage (built)
- Designated: 21 October 1992
- Reference no.: 600116
- Significant period: 1886, (fabric); 1948, 1949–c. 1970, 1960 (historical)
- Builders: George Gazzard

Hunters Buildings is a heritage-listed group of commercial buildings at 179–191 George Street (with frontages onto Elizabeth Street), Brisbane City, City of Brisbane, Queensland, Australia. The individual buildings are Treasury Chambers, St Francis House, and Symons Building. They were designed by Richard Gailey and built in 1886 by George Gazzard. They were added to the Queensland Heritage Register on 21 October 1992.

== History ==
Three buildings, Treasury Chambers & St Francis House & Symons Building, were built in 1886 as prestige office accommodation and shops. Their construction reflected the atmosphere of prosperity and optimism generated in Queensland with the 1880s growth in real estate, construction and mining sectors. In 1885 James Hunter, boot manufacturer and property developer, took a 25-year lease from William Cribb on several adjoining allotments on the corner of George and Elizabeth Streets. Hunter anticipated the need for fashionable office accommodation close to the new government offices (Treasury Building) then under construction. He planned to erect, in two stages, a large L-shaped complex fronting George and Elizabeth Streets with accommodation for shops and offices.

The building was designed by Richard Gailey and the contractor was George Gazzard. The first stage of the "Hunters Building" project, with frontages to George and Elizabeth Streets, was completed in 1886 for an estimated cost of £10,000. Financial problems prevented Hunter proceeding with the second stage – a corner section linking the George and Elizabeth Street buildings. In 1887 Hunter sub-let part of his lease to Denis O'Connor who built the Treasury Hotel on the corner site. In 1900 Hunter was declared bankrupt.

Despite the "gap" between the Elizabeth Street section (St Francis House and Symons Building) and the George Street section (Treasury Chambers), the Hunter's Buildings was regarded as a unit. Newspaper reports indicate that a balcony connected all upper floor offices and this is consistent with the official address given for the upper floor tenants of the Elizabeth Street buildings as 183 George Street – this practice continued until 1923. The location and architectural distinction of the building attracted notable tenants. For the first two years various government departments were housed there until the William Street section of the Treasury Building was completed in 1889.

In 1906, William Cribb donated the property to the YMCA which subsequently subdivided and sold most of the land by 1910.

In the early 1920s, the George Street land was subdivided again and by the end of the decade various parts of the site were held on separate titles. Prominent long-term tenants were A P Greenfield & Co and Whitehouse Pianos. Their fellow-occupants included societies, workers in the professions and the skilled clothing trades and teachers of the arts.

The Elizabeth Street buildings remained under one title (owned by the Caledonian Society) until 1949 when the present St Francis House was bought by the Order of Capuchin Franciscan Fathers. The fathers conducted masses and social events in their building until about 1970. A fire at the Caledonian Society rooms in 1948 destroyed the society's records and may have prompted the major changes to the facade of the present Symons Building. In 1960 the Caledonian Society moved to Kangaroo Point selling their Elizabeth Street building to the Symons family who renamed the building and used it as a suit factory for almost thirty years.

In 1960 the back extension (c. 1910) of the Symons Building became the home of Charles Lisner's Academy Theatre, and later the first home of the Queensland Ballet Company. This artistic focus was accompanied by commercial and light industrial use of the Elizabeth Street buildings, during which period the interiors were altered substantially.

In 1993 most of St Francis House & Symons Building were demolished, but the Elizabeth Street facades remain.

== Description ==
Treasury Chambers, located in George Street opposite the Treasury Building, is a three storeyed rendered brick office building. Like the Treasury Building and the adjacent Treasury Hotel, the facade features classical detailing.

The facade contains a narrow entry bay with a raised pediment and an oriel window and eight three-storeyed bays. Individual bays are marked by pilasters which rise through both upper levels and culminate in moulded capitals. The line of each pilaster is carried through to roof level by a projected section of cornice topped by a block in the parapet and a pedestal and ball above the parapet line. Each bay contains three window openings flanked by small pilasters with acanthus leaf capitals. A broad string course decorated with a row of rosettes separates the square-headed windows of the first floor from those on the upper level. These are arched and their keystones extend to a cornice embellished with brackets and a row of dentils. The balustraded parapet is pierced by arcaded openings.

Pediments mark the end bay and the proposed central entry. The entry bay is further differentiated from the other bays by an oriel window which extends from the first floor and culminates in a balcony at the second floor.

The ground floor facades have been altered to provide aluminium framed shop fronts. The suspended awning replaced a curved awning which had a barrel vault emphasising the entry.

Internally, the ground floors to all the tenancies and most upper floors, have been altered. Some upper levels contain original fabric, including pressed metal ceilings.

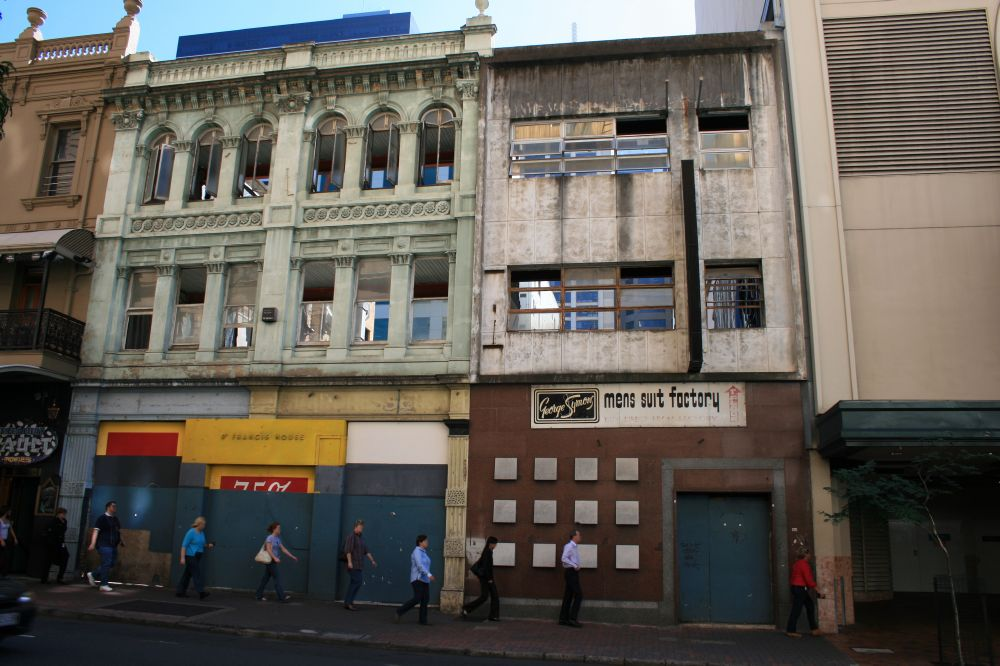
St Francis House & Symons Building (Elizabeth Street), 2009

St Francis House and Symons Building, with frontages to Elizabeth Street, were a continuation of Treasury Chambers.

The facade of the northern end of the Elizabeth Street section, the Symons Building, has been rebuilt with unadorned reinforced concrete facade with metal windows. The facade of the southern section, St Francis House, consists of two bays which have been altered at the ground floor. Above this the two bays are differentiated by double height pilasters. Each bay contains three window openings on each level, those on the first floor level are square headed and those on the upper level arched. The facade is decorated with moulded plaster details including small pilasters with acanthus leaf capitals, rosettes, keystones, brackets, cornice and balustraded parapet.

== Heritage listing ==
The Hunters Buildings were listed on the Queensland Heritage Register on 21 October 1992 having satisfied the following criteria.

The place is important in demonstrating the evolution or pattern of Queensland's history.

The buildings, erected in the mid-1880s as a commercial investment, is important in demonstrating the pattern of Queensland's history, being material evidence of the optimism generated by the economic prosperity of the era.

The place is important in demonstrating the principal characteristics of a particular class of cultural places.

Importantly, the place demonstrates the principal characteristics of an 1880s prestige office building in Queensland, and the commercial work of acclaimed Brisbane architect Richard Gailey.

The place is important because of its aesthetic significance.

The buildings also exhibits aesthetic characteristics valued by the community, in particular its contribution to the George Street streetscape as part of a group of buildings of complementary scale and fine detail in this section of George Street between Queen and Elizabeth Streets, and its contribution to the Elizabeth Street streetscape through its scale and detailing.
