= Treasury Hotel =

Historic hotel in Brisbane, Queensland

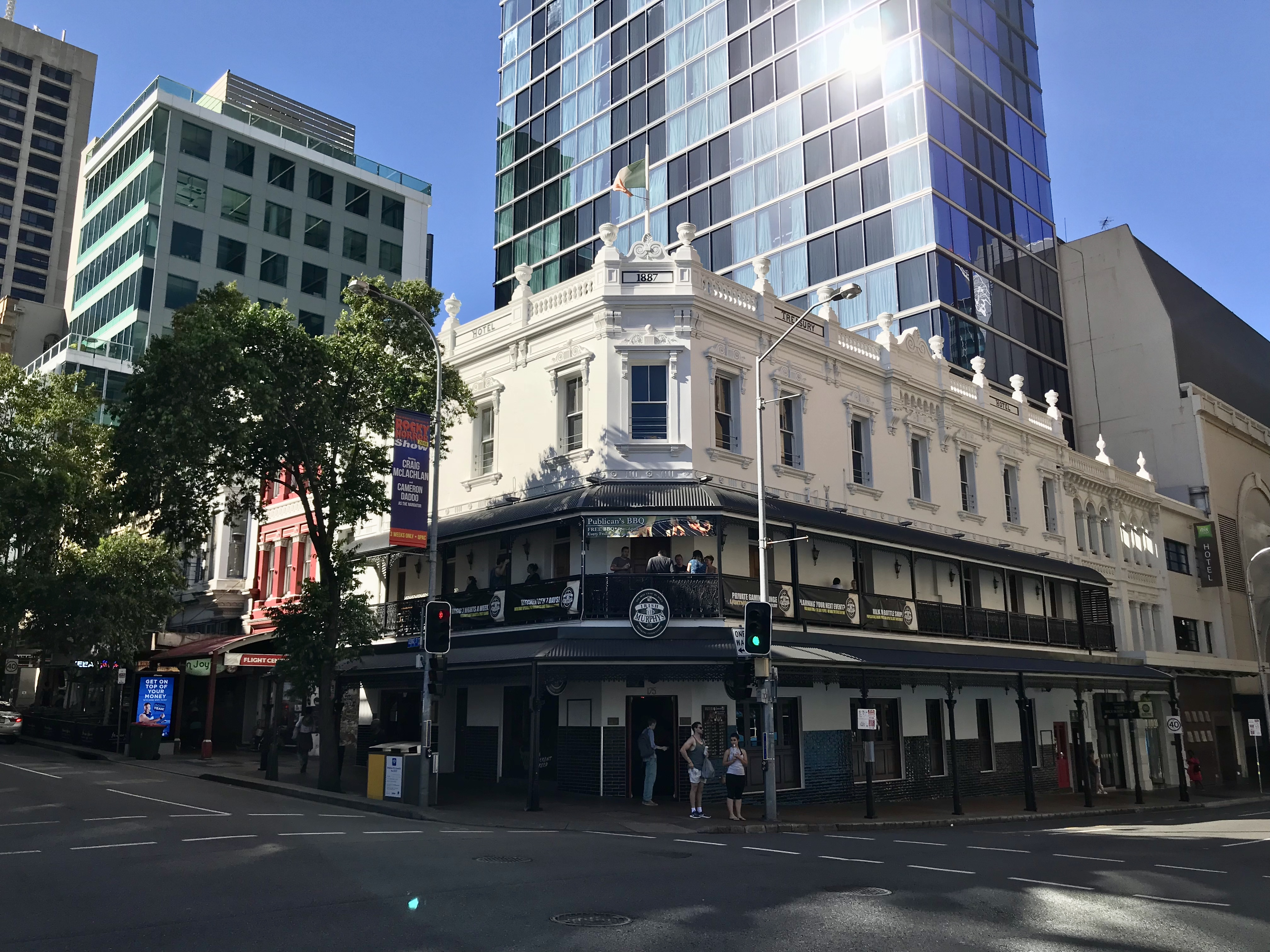
- Treasury Hotel, 2018

- Location within Queensland Location within Australia
- 27.4715°S 153.0244°E
- Location: 175 George Street, Brisbane City, City of Brisbane, Queensland, Australia

History
- Design period: 1870s–1890s (late 19th century)
- Built: 1887–1888

Site notes
- Architect: John Hall & Son
- Architectural style: Classicism

Queensland Heritage Register
- Official name: Treasury Hotel
- Type: state heritage (built)
- Designated: 4 November 1993
- Reference no.: 600115
- Significant period: 1887–1888 (fabric)
- Builders: Abraham James

The Treasury Hotel is a heritage-listed hotel at 175 George Street, Brisbane, Australia. It was designed by John Hall & Son and built from 1887 to 1888 by Abraham James. It was added to the Queensland Heritage Register on 4 November 1993. Today, the hotel trades under the name Irish Murphy's.

== History ==
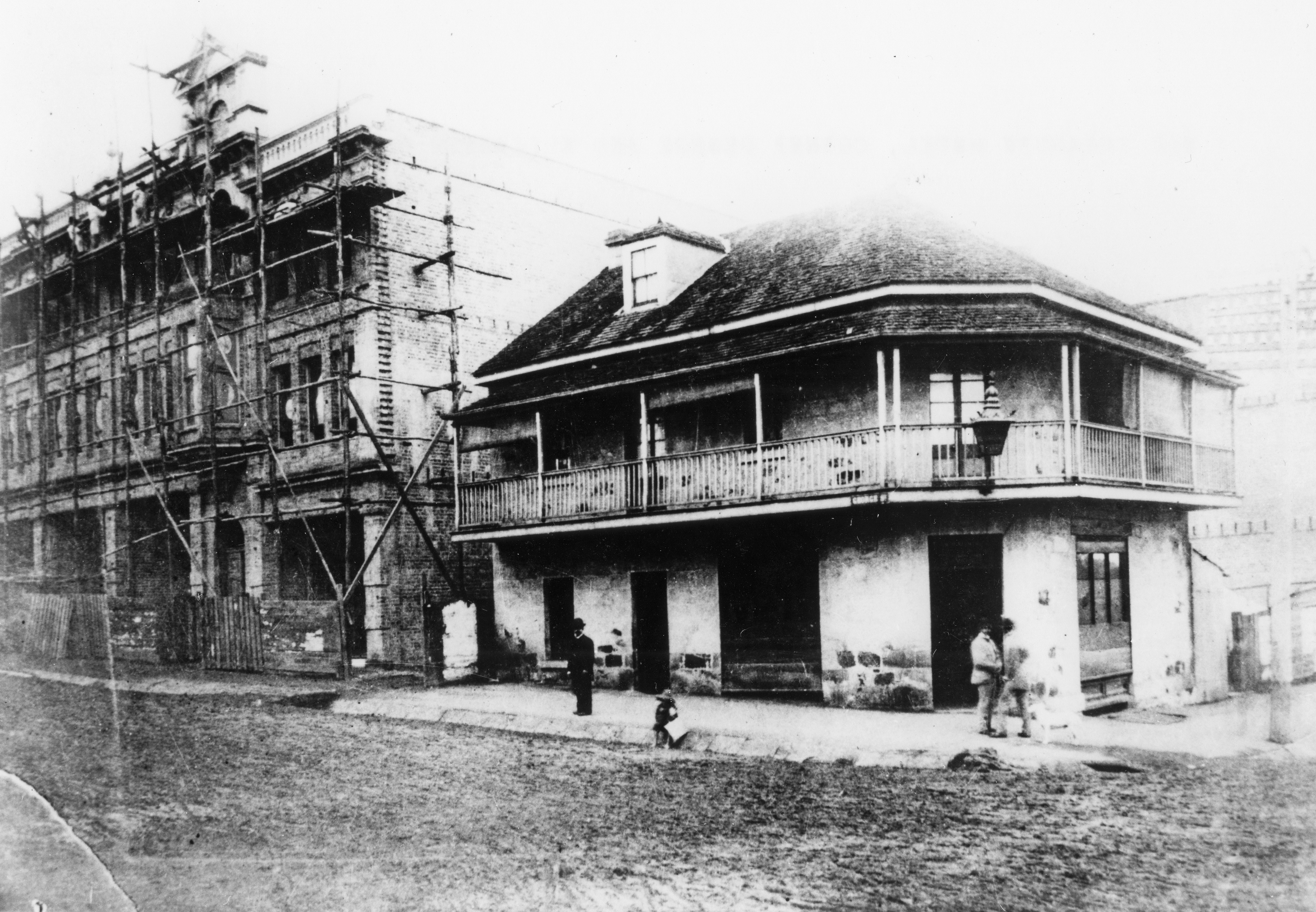
Dunmore Arms Hotel, the earlier hotel on the site of the Treasury Hotel, corner of George and Elizabeth Streets, 1886

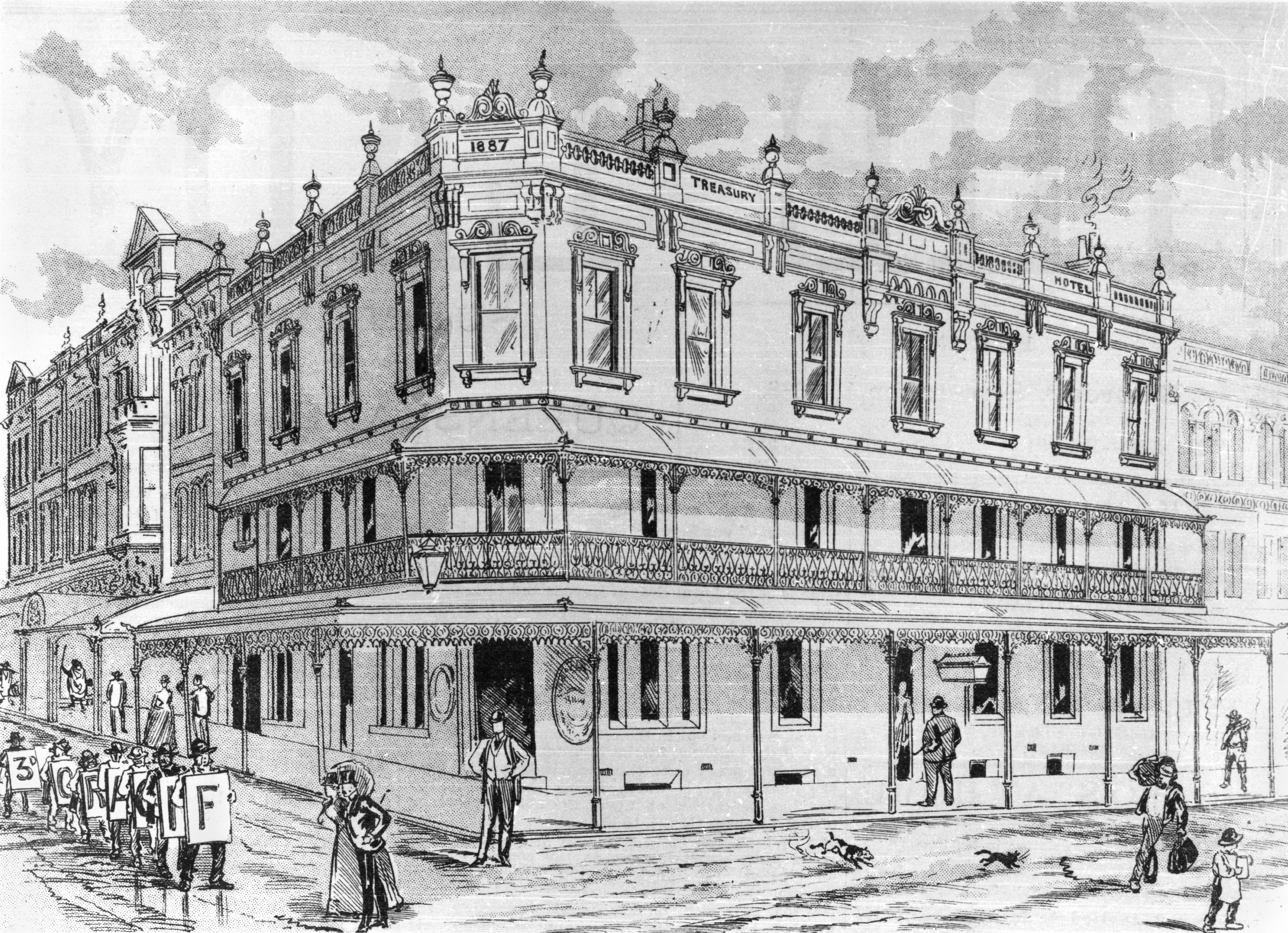
Illustration of the Treasury Hotel, circa 1889

The Treasury Hotel was built in 1887–1888, replacing an earlier hotel, the Dunmore Arms (1865).

In 1885 James Hunter took a 25-year lease from William Cribb on several adjoining allotments on the corner of George and Elizabeth Streets from William Cribb.

Hunter planned a major commercial development on the site, and in 1886 erected office buildings with Treasury Chambers fronting George St and Francis House on Elizabeth Street (Hunters Buildings). The choice of location was astute, for the new Treasury Building opposite was being erected and enhanced the prestige of the area. Financial problems prevented Hunter from completing the project and in 1887 he sub-let the Dunmore Arms site to well-known Brisbane publican, Denis O'Connor.

O'Connor engaged architects John Hall & Son to design a new hotel for the site. The contractor was Abraham James and the contract sum £3,999. Borrowing its name from the partially finished new government offices opposite, the hotel offered "tastefully furnished and decorated" accommodation to "Families and Commercial Gentlemen". In May 1889 O'Connor transferred his sub-lease to George Back Cutbush who remained the lessee until 1910. In 1906 William Cribb donated both allotments 18 & 19 to the YMCA in return for an annuity of £400.

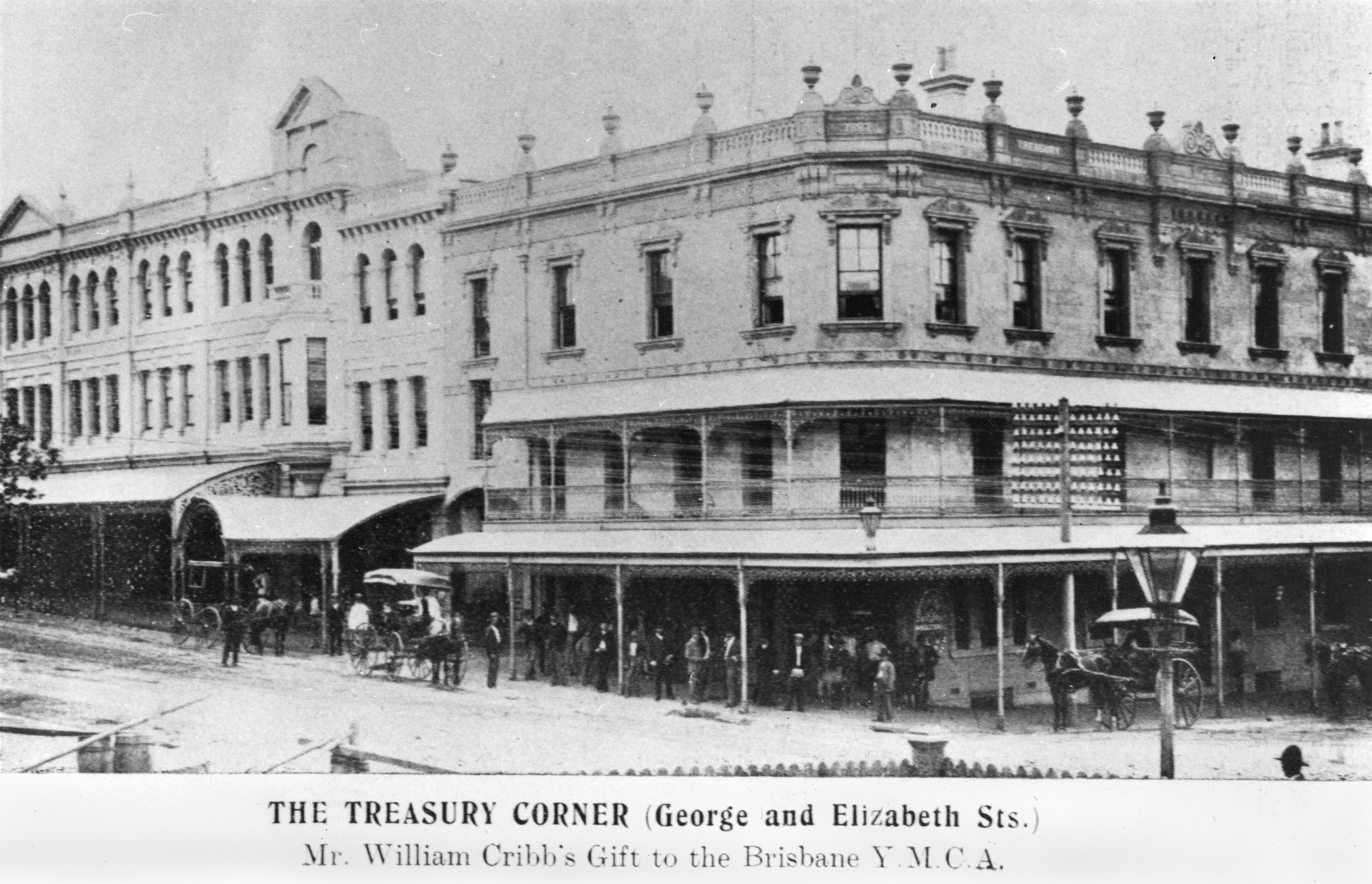
Treasury Hotel, 1906

Over the next few years the YMCA sold most of this property and the new owner of the Treasury Hotel in 1908 was William Denis O'Connor. The hotel remained linked with the O'Connor family till the late 1950s.

During the late 1880s the Treasury Hotel was one of a large number of hotels in the city. In 1889 there were 9 hotels in George Street. The Treasury Hotel and the Transcontinental Hotel are the only George Street buildings from this period that remain in use as hotels.

In 2015, the hotel is trading under the name "Irish Murphy's".

== Description ==
The Treasury Hotel, located on the corner of George and Elizabeth Streets, is a three storey building with basement. It contains classical detailing, as do other nearby prominent buildings including the Treasury Building) and Treasury Chambers (Hunters Buildings).

Typical of many hotels, it is located on a corner site and has a truncated corner that originally contained the entry. The hotel was originally L-shaped and an arched carriageway in George Street gave access to the rear of the building. This rear courtyard has been built in and is now part of the hotel.

On the main facades, there is a decorative string course above the first floor verandah roof. The windows on the second floor have moulded bracketed sills and decorative pediments. Above this are regularly spaced paired brackets supporting a cornice, surmounted by a parapet. Pedestals carrying urns divide the parapet into sections, some of which contain balustrading, while others are solid with the title "TREASURY HOTEL" in raised lettering. On the centre of the parapet of the Elizabeth Street facade is a pediment. A similar pediment crowns the corner and has a flagpole located behind it.

The ground floor below a street awning has been modified and covered in modern brickwork. The upper two storeys retain much of the original detail, but some of this is obscured by modern sun hoods and an altered first-floor verandah which has raked posts. Some herring-bone strutting is situated between the joists of the structure spanning the laneway off George Street beside the building. Internally, none of the original detailing remains as a result of the building being thoroughly renovated in the late 1970s.

== Heritage listing ==
Treasury Hotel was listed on the Queensland Heritage Register on 4 November 1993 having satisfied the following criteria.

The place is important in demonstrating the evolution or pattern of Queensland's history.

The Treasury Hotel is important in demonstrating the pattern of Queensland's history, in particular the evolution of hotels in Brisbane.

The place is important in demonstrating the principal characteristics of a particular class of cultural places.

The Treasury Hotel demonstrates the principal characteristics of a nineteenth century inner city hotel.

The place is important because of its aesthetic significance.

The Treasury Hotel exhibits particular aesthetic characteristics valued by the community, including its prominence on the corner of George and Elizabeth Streets and its position as part of a group of buildings of complementary scale and fine detail that address Queens Park.
