= Peter Murphy (businessman) =

Australian politician

The Hon Peter Murphy

Member of the Queensland Legislative Council
- In office 4 May 1904 – 23 March 1922

Personal details
- Born: Peter Murphy; 29 June 1853 Mohill, County Leitrim, Ireland
- Died: 24 February 1925 (aged 71) Brisbane, Queensland, Australia
- Resting place: Nudgee Cemetery
- Spouse: Ellen Imelda Bulcock (m.1885 d.1934)
- Relations: John Fihelly (son-in-law)
- Occupation: Businessman

Peter Murphy (1853–1925) was a businessman and politician in Brisbane, Queensland, Australia. He was a Member of the Queensland Legislative Council.

== Early life ==
Peter Murphy was born on 26 June 1853 in the West of Ireland, the son of James and Ann Murphy. He trained as a draper in Ireland and immigrated to Brisbane in 1871. He married Ellen Bulcock in 1885.

== Business ==
He built the Transcontinental Hotel in George Street in 1883–4. The hotel remained in the Murphy family until 1935 when it was bought by Castlemaine Perkins. The hotel still operates and is listed on the Queensland Heritage Register.

== Politics ==
Peter Murphy was appointed to the Queensland Legislative Council on 4 May 1904. Although a lifetime appointment, the Council voted to abolish itself on 23 March 1922.

== Later life ==
Peter Murphy died on Tuesday 24 February 1925. He had been ill for some months and collapsed during a heat wave. His funeral was held on Wednesday 25 February 1925 at St Stephen's Roman Catholic Cathedral in Brisbane, after which he was buried in Nudgee Cemetery.
