= George Street, Brisbane =

Street in Brisbane, Queensland

George Street Queensland
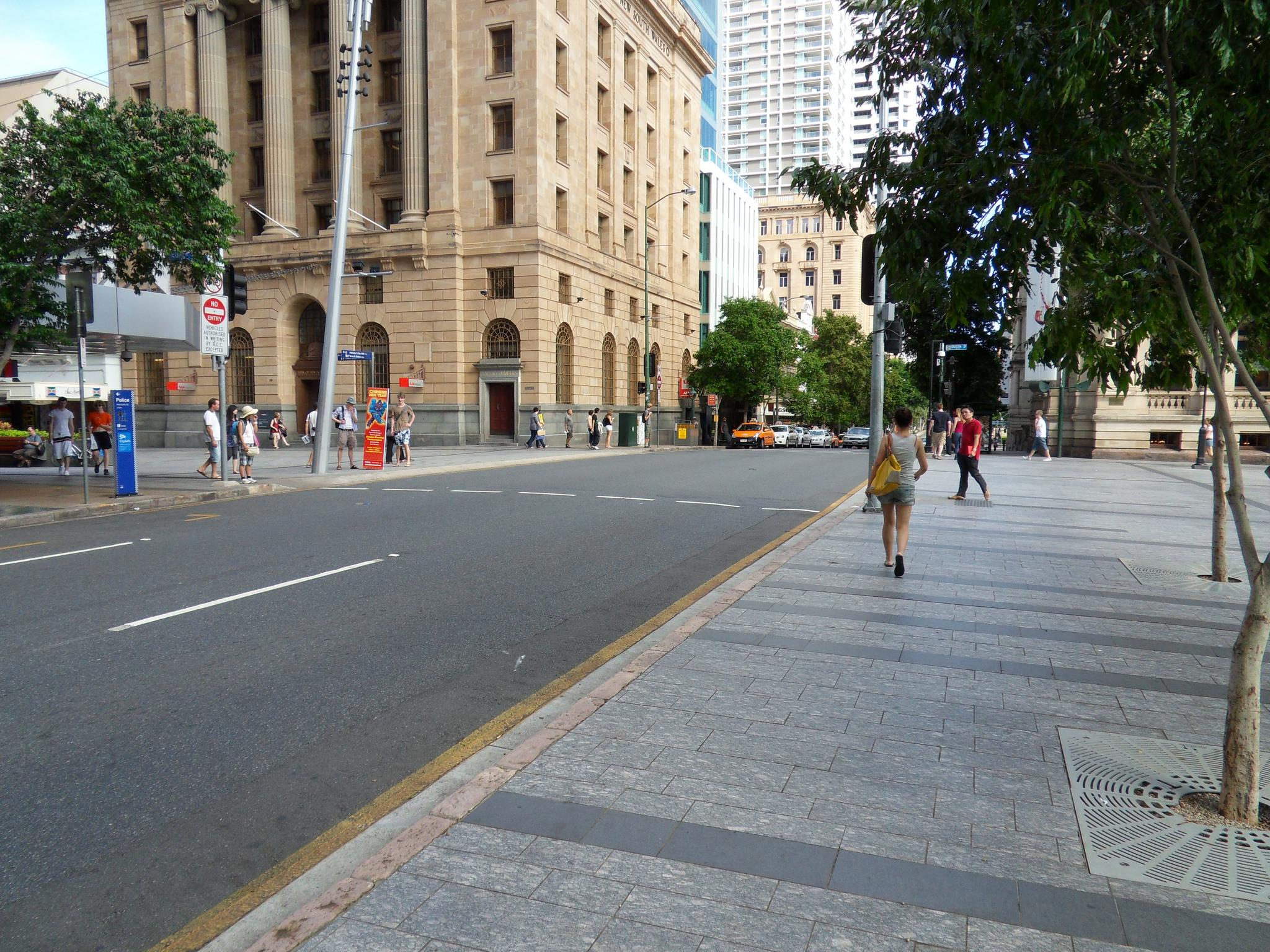
- George Street from Queen Street intersection
- Coordinates: 27.470453°S 153.023058°E

General information
- Type: Street
- Location: Brisbane

George Street is a major road in the central business district of Brisbane, Australia. The street is named for King George IV, who was monarch of Australia at the time the Moreton Bay penal settlement was established, and runs from Roma Street in the north to Alice Street and Parliament House in the south. As one of Brisbane’s oldest thoroughfares, it is a hub of commerce and public administration, with numerous government departments and agencies headquartered along the street and in its immediate vicinity.

== Geography ==
George Street extends from the Queensland University of Technology's Garden Point campus and City Botanic Gardens at its south-east end (27.4756°S 153.0281°E), through the commercial centre of Brisbane (Queen Street and Queen Street Mall), through to Roma Street railway station at its north-west end (27.4667°S 153.0196°E).

The State Parliament House building for the state of Queensland and Brisbane Square, as well as the Queen Elizabeth II Courts of Law and the State Law Building are found on the street. Queens Gardens, Treasury Building, Lands Administration Building and The Mansions are all located on George Street. Other office towers built on George Street include 111 George Street, 275 George Street and 400 George Street. At the northern end is the Roma Street railway station.

== History ==
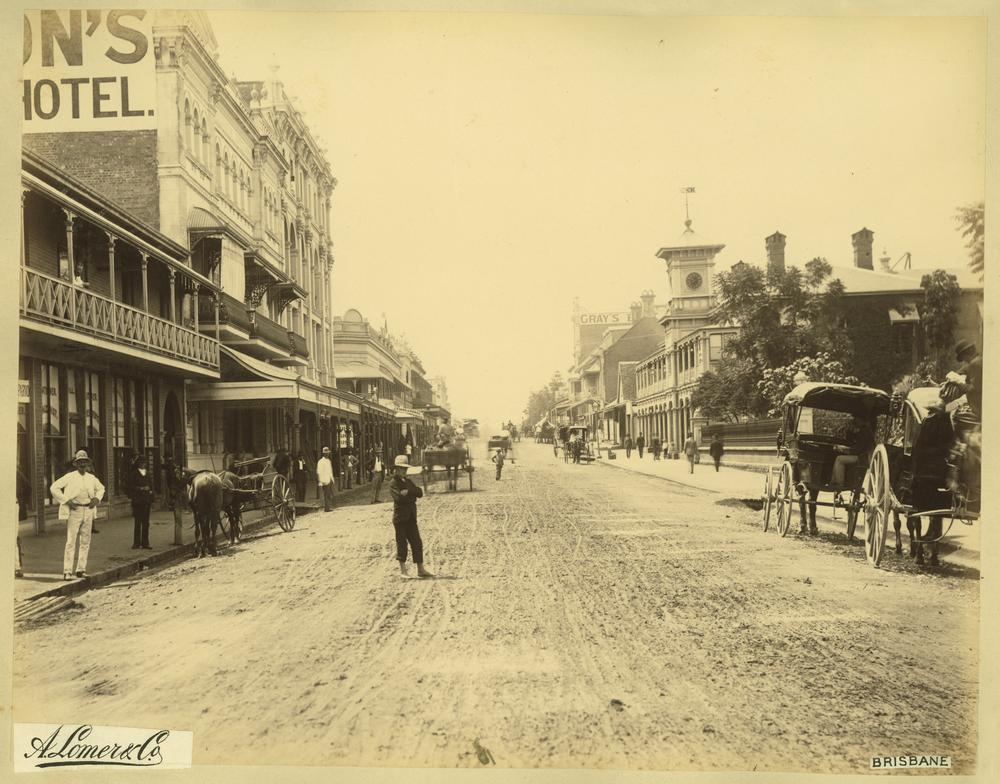
George Street in 1889

George Street as well as Queen Street, Wickham Street and the area known as Petrie Bight were unsealed and often dusty before 1899. In 1897, the North Brisbane Council held an election on whether a loan should be raised so the streets could be woodblocked. Agreement was given after a close decision by only a third of registered voters, however the results were limited as the surface was very slippery during the rain and buckled during heavy rains.

The first private residence in Brisbane, a weatherboard, low-ceilinged cottage, was built on George Street. The building remained intact into the 1880s but like similar early houses in the central business district they have been demolished and the land redeveloped.

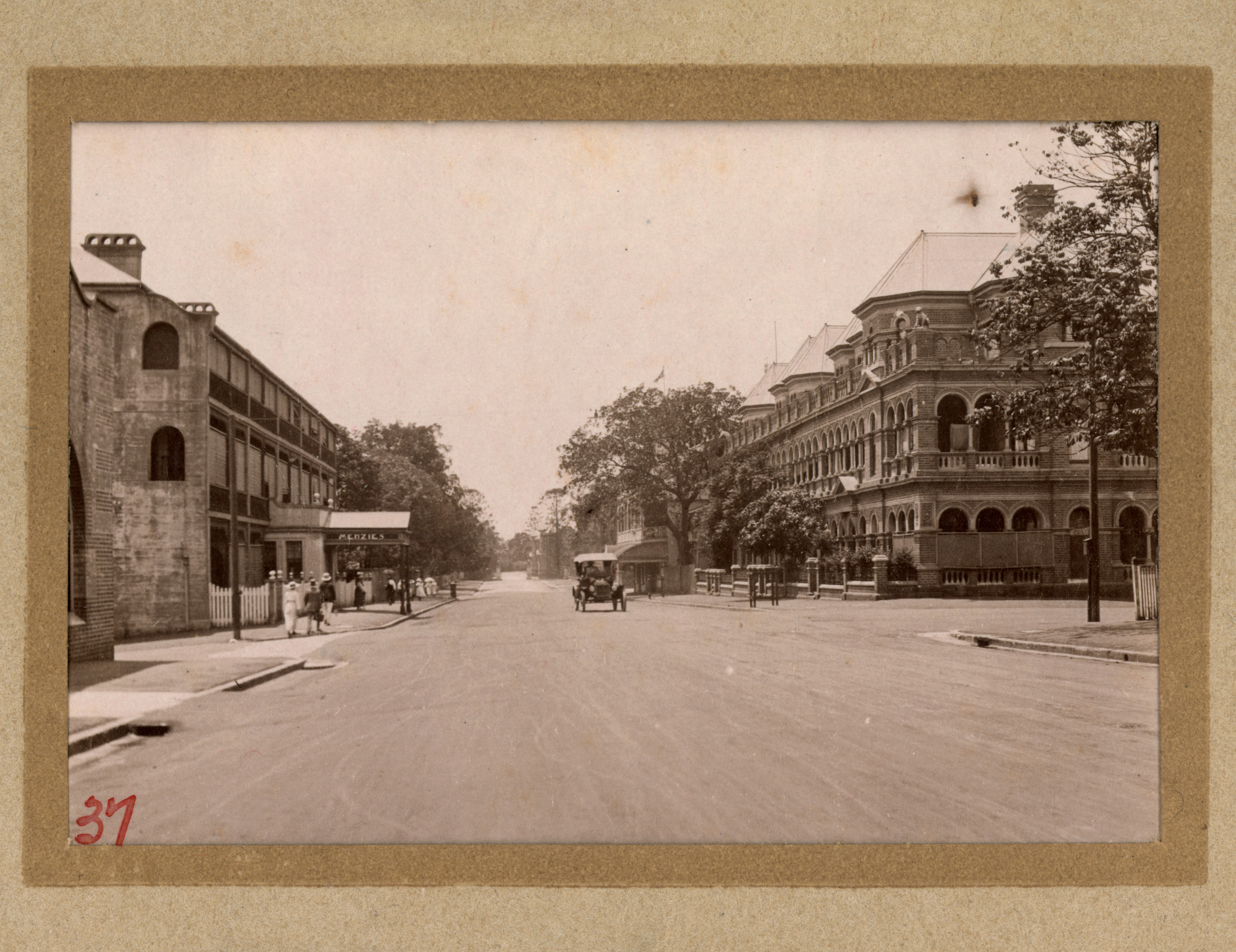
View along George Street, Brisbane towards the Brisbane Technical College, with the Menzies Hotel on the left and The Mansions on the right, circa 1919

In 1867, the Menzies Private Hotel was established at 28 George Street (corner of Margaret Street and adjacent to the Queensland Club). It was refurbished and re-opened as the Kingsley Private Hotel in July 1922. It has since been demolished.

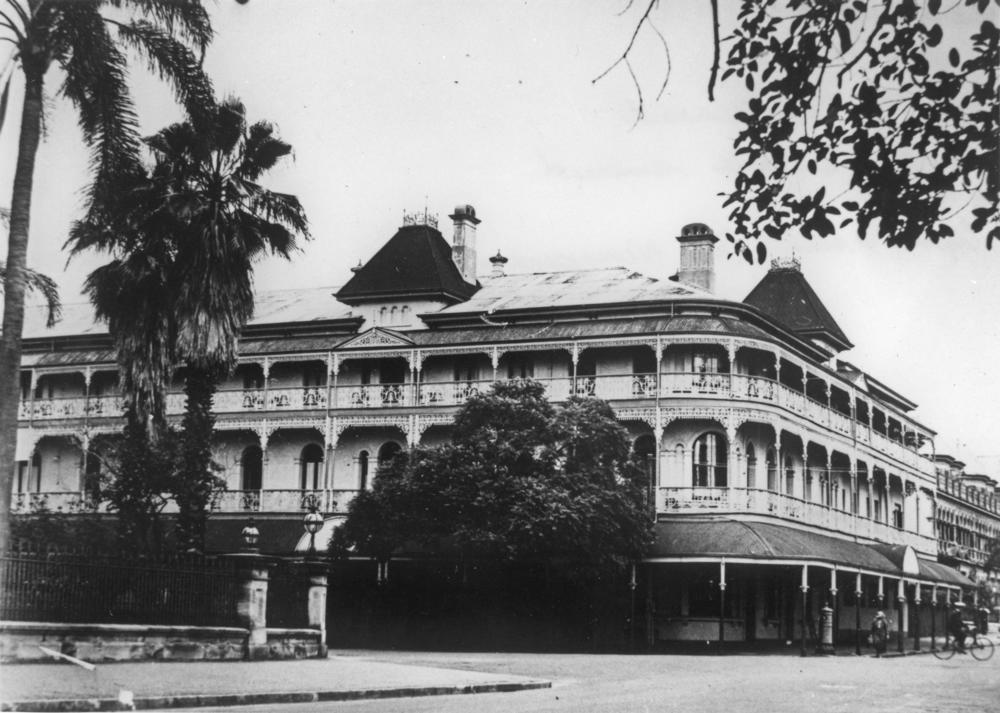
Bellevue Hotel, 1933

The Bellevue Hotel opened on the western corner of George and Alice Streets c. 1885. It served for many years as Brisbane's premier hotel. Without any prior public announcement, the Queensland Government demolished the building overnight on 20 April 1979.

In 1911, Queensland belatedly established its first university, the University of Queensland, in the Old Government House at the end of George Street. By the late 1930s, the university outgrew this site, moving its main campus to St Lucia after World War II.

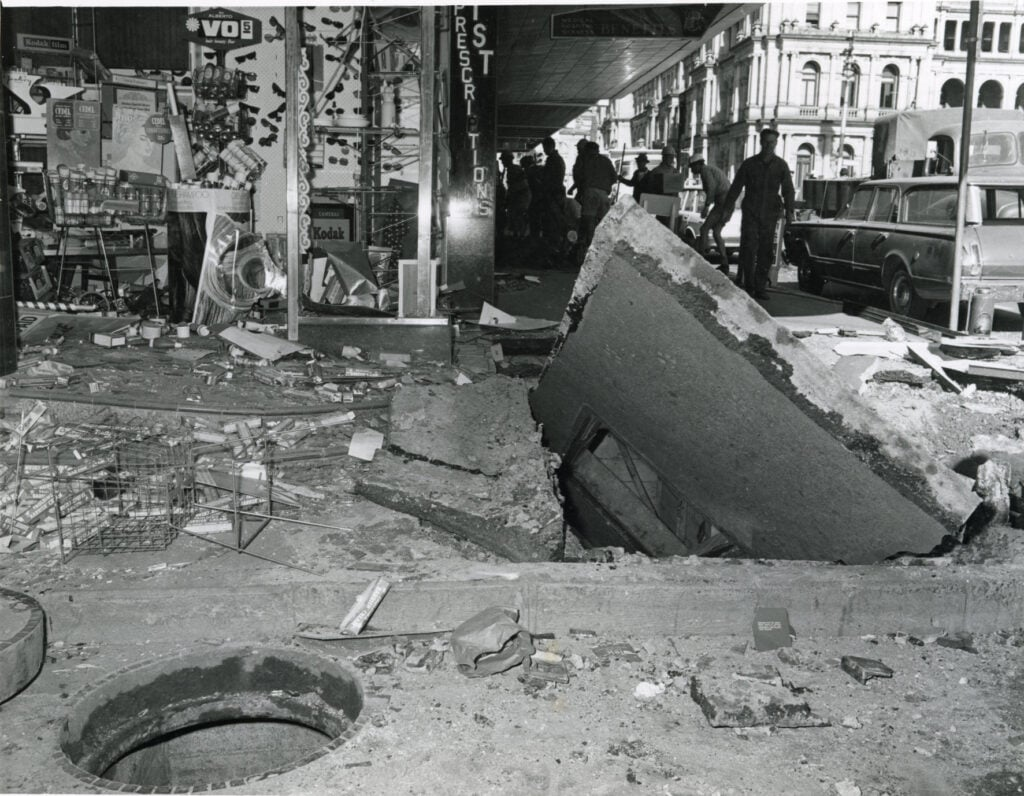
Damage following gas explosion, George Street, Brisbane, July 1970

On Friday 17 July 1970, a faulty fuse in a traffic light created a spark that ignited a leaking gas pipe running through the basements of several George Street buildings (between Queen Street and Adelaide Street) which caused a series of explosions, killing one woman and injuring 38 other people. The damage to buildings in George Street and neighbouring streets as well as roads and other infrastructure was estimated at $500,000.

== Heritage sites ==
George Street has a number of heritage-listed sites, including:

- 2 George Street: the former Brisbane Central Technical College
- 2 George Street: Old Government House
- 19 George Street: Queensland Club
- 40 George Street: The Mansions
- 68 George Street: Harris Terrace
- 110 George Street and 84 William Street: the former Queensland Government Printing Office
- 142 George Street: Lands Administration Building and its First World War Honour Board
- 144 George Street: Queens Gardens
- 171 George Street: Family Services Building
- 175 George Street: Treasury Hotel
- 179–191 George Street (with frontages to Elizabeth Street): Hunters Buildings: Treasury Chambers, St Francis House, & Symons Building
- 331 & 333 George Street: BAFS Building
- 414 George Street: McDonnell & East Ltd Building
- 468–482 George Street: Transcontinental Hotel
- Sections of Albert St, George St, William St, North Quay, Queen's Wharf Rd: Early Streets of Brisbane
- 69 Alice Street: Parliament House (also faces onto George Street)

== Queen's Wharf development ==
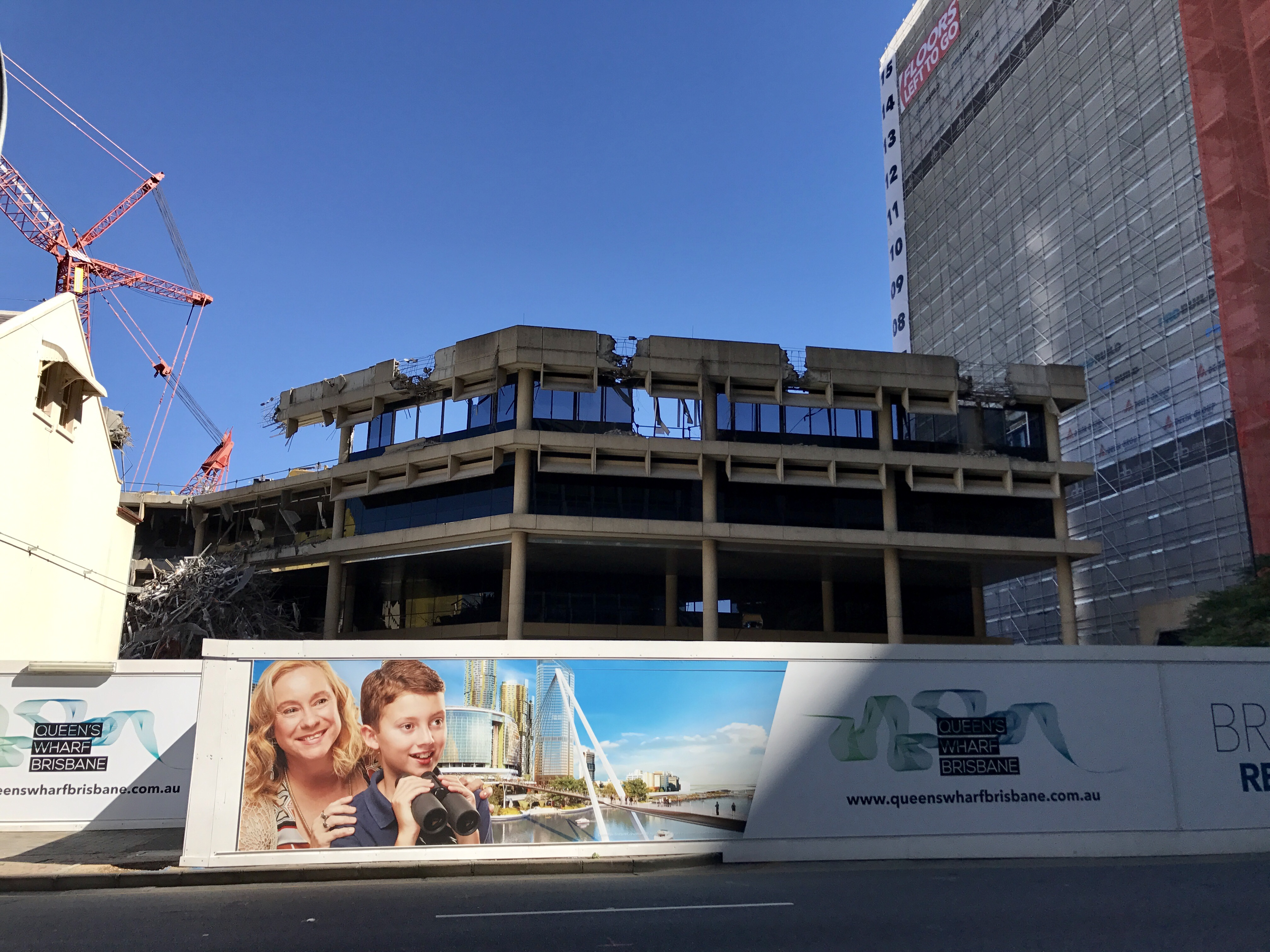
Demolition of government buildings in George Street as part of the Queen's Wharf development, August 2017

The Queen's Wharf development of an entertainment precinct will be bounded by Queen Street, George Street, Alice Street and the Brisbane River (including all of William Street). All of the non-heritage buildings on the site will be demolished.

== Gallery ==
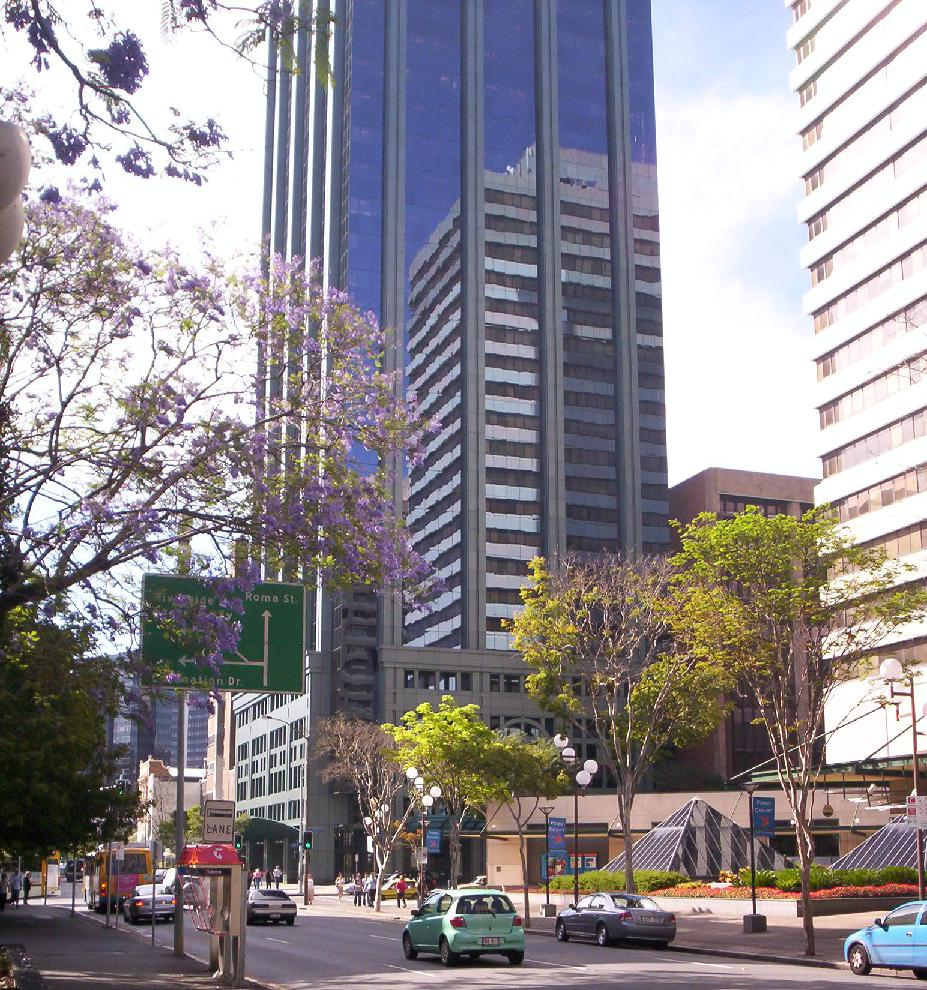
State Law Building
George Street façade

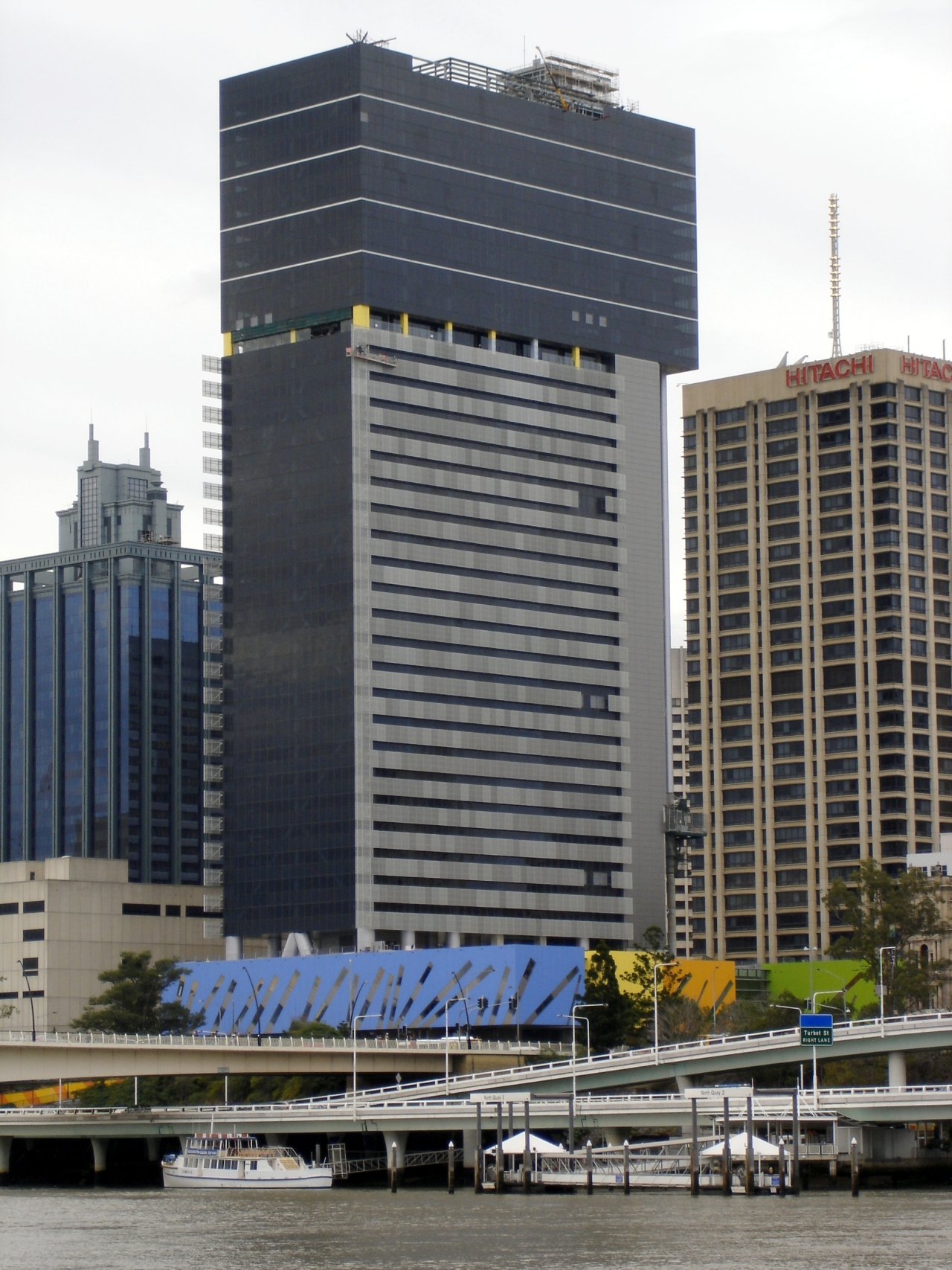
Brisbane Square

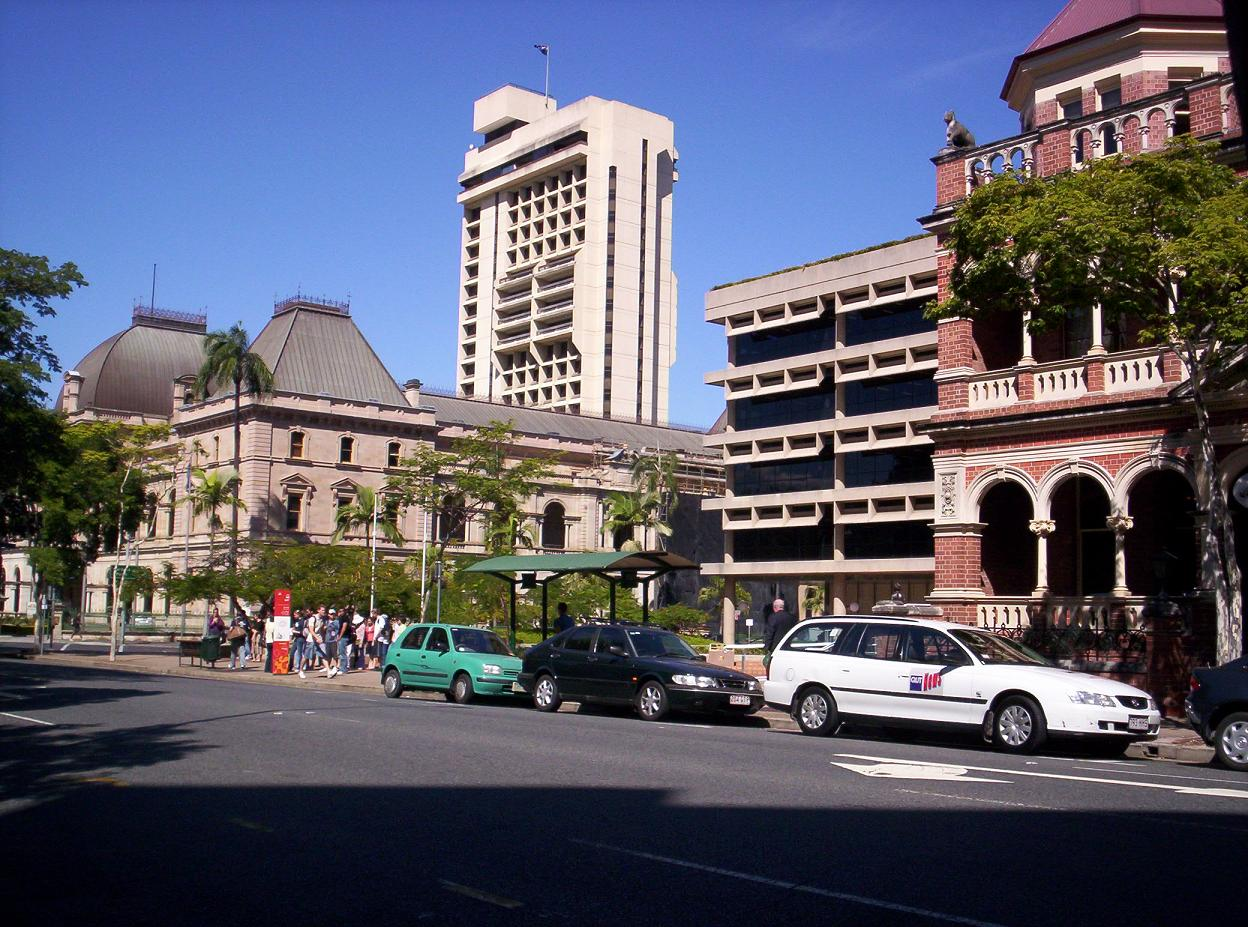
Parliament House and The Mansions
George Street façade

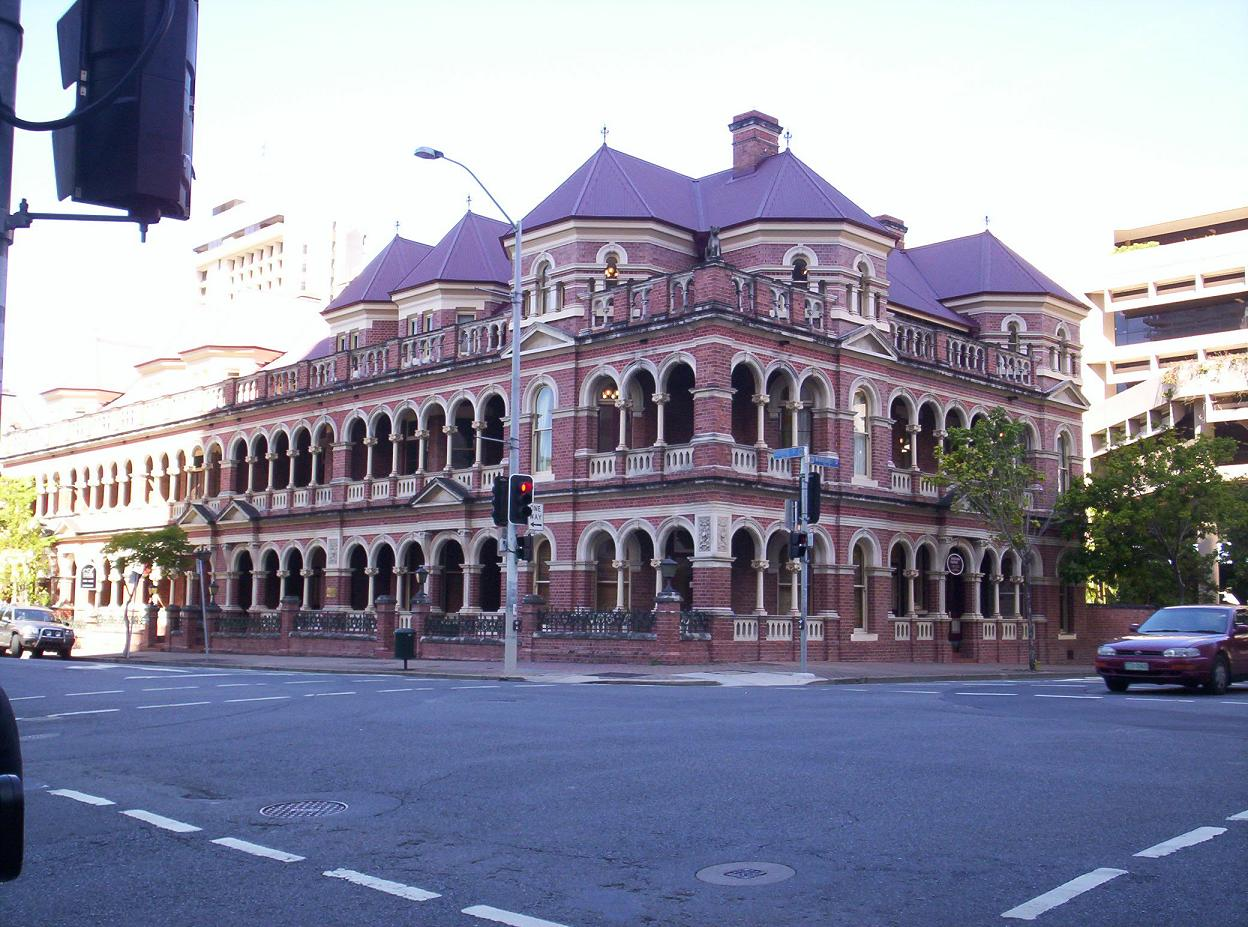
The Mansions
George Street façade

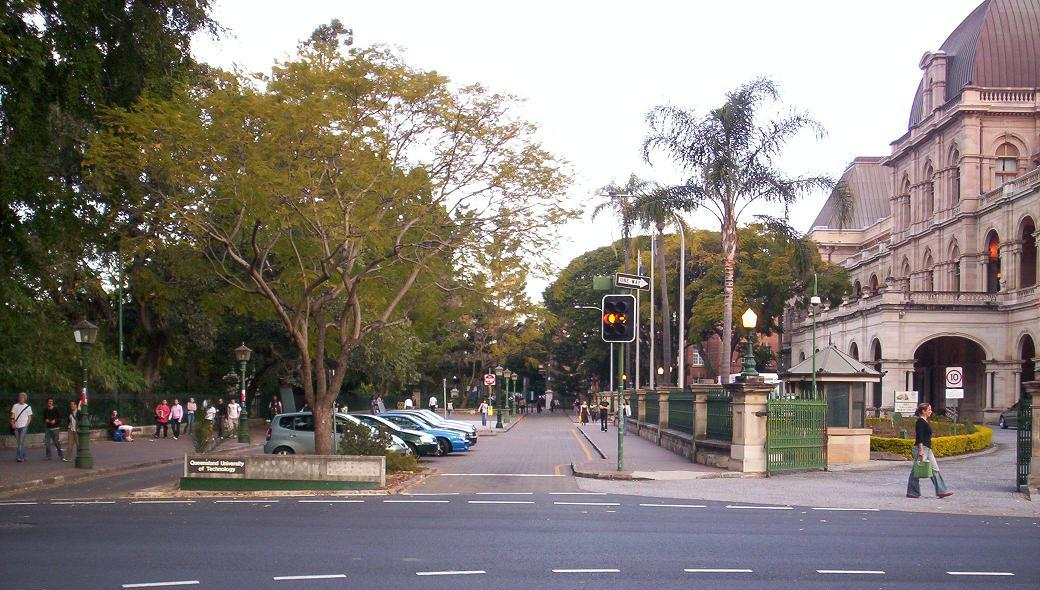
George Street entrance to the Queensland University of Technology Gardens Point campus. The City Botanic Gardens are at the left, and Parliament House is at the right

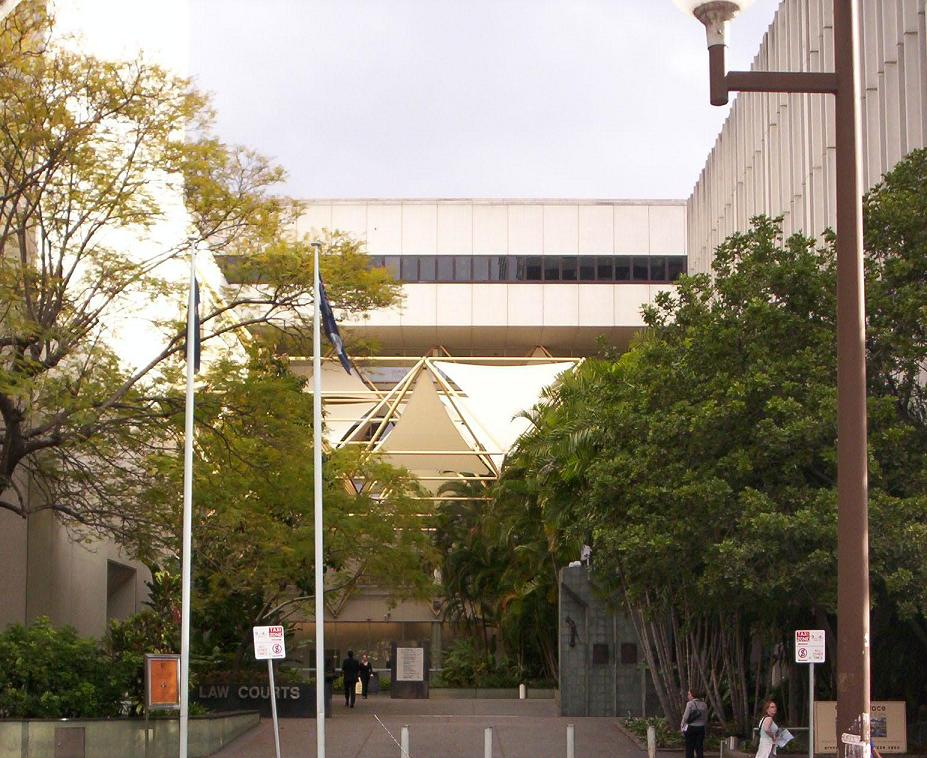
Law Courts Complex, George Street, façade

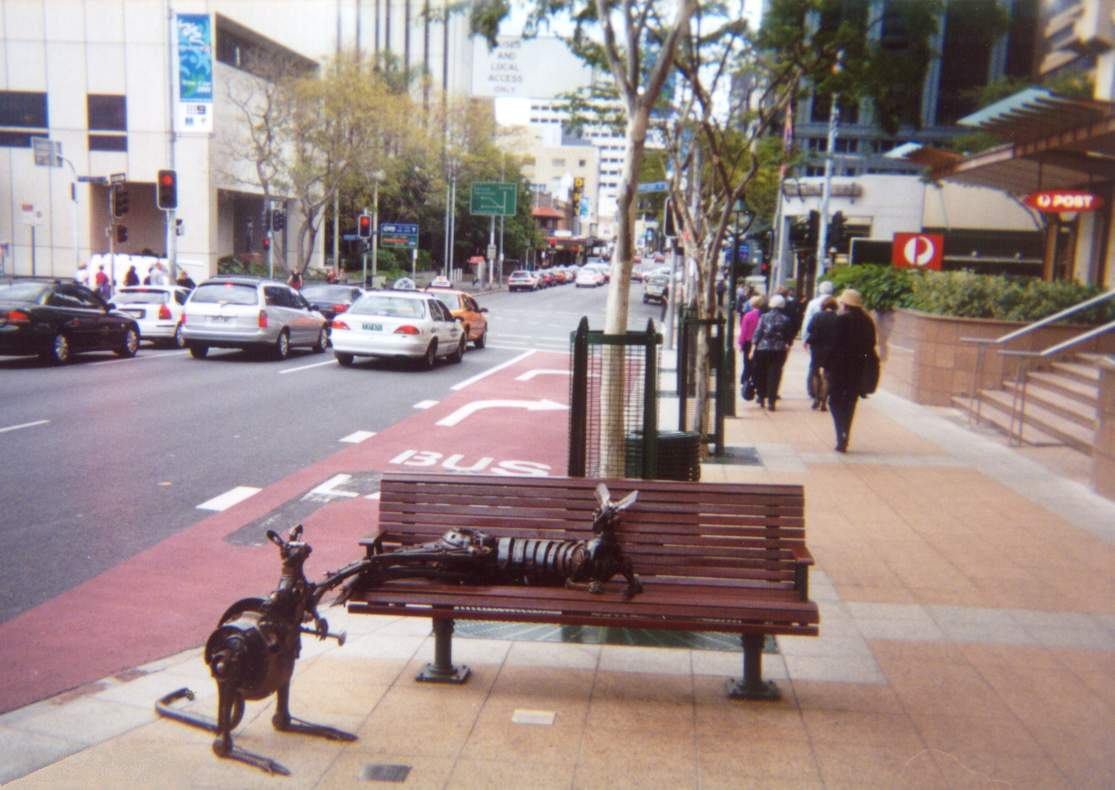
George Street City Roos sculptures (opposite Brisbane Square)

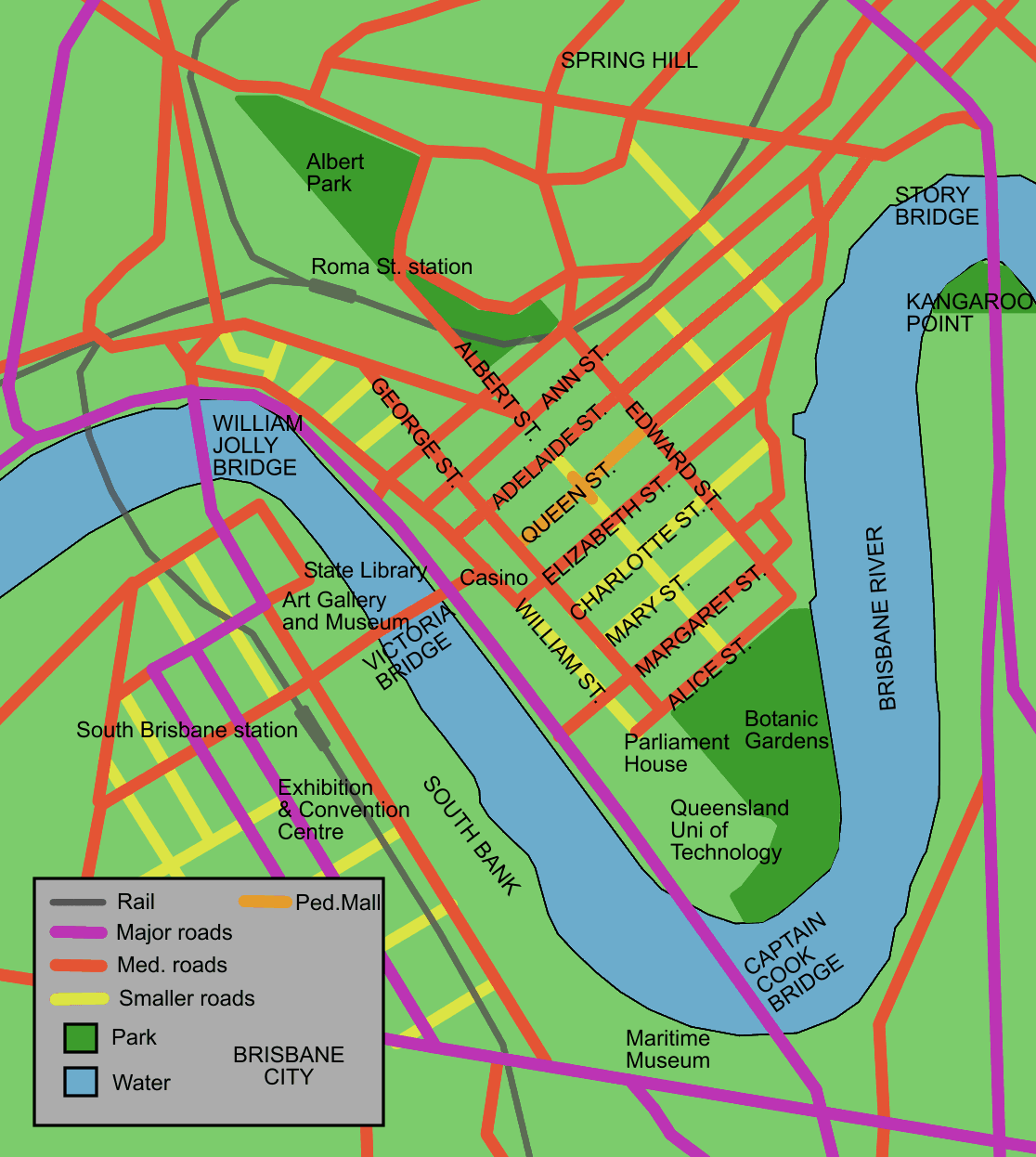
Map of Brisbane CBD.

== Major intersections ==
- Alice Street
- Margaret Street
- Mary Street
- Charlotte Street
- Elizabeth Street
- Queen Street
- Adelaide Street
- Ann Street
- Turbot Street
- Tank Street
- Herschel Street
- Roma Street

== See also ==
- Daniel Marquis, who operated a photographic studio at 82 George St.
- Brisbane Quarter, mixed use development at 300 George Street.
