= Daniel Marquis =

Australian photographer (1829–1879)

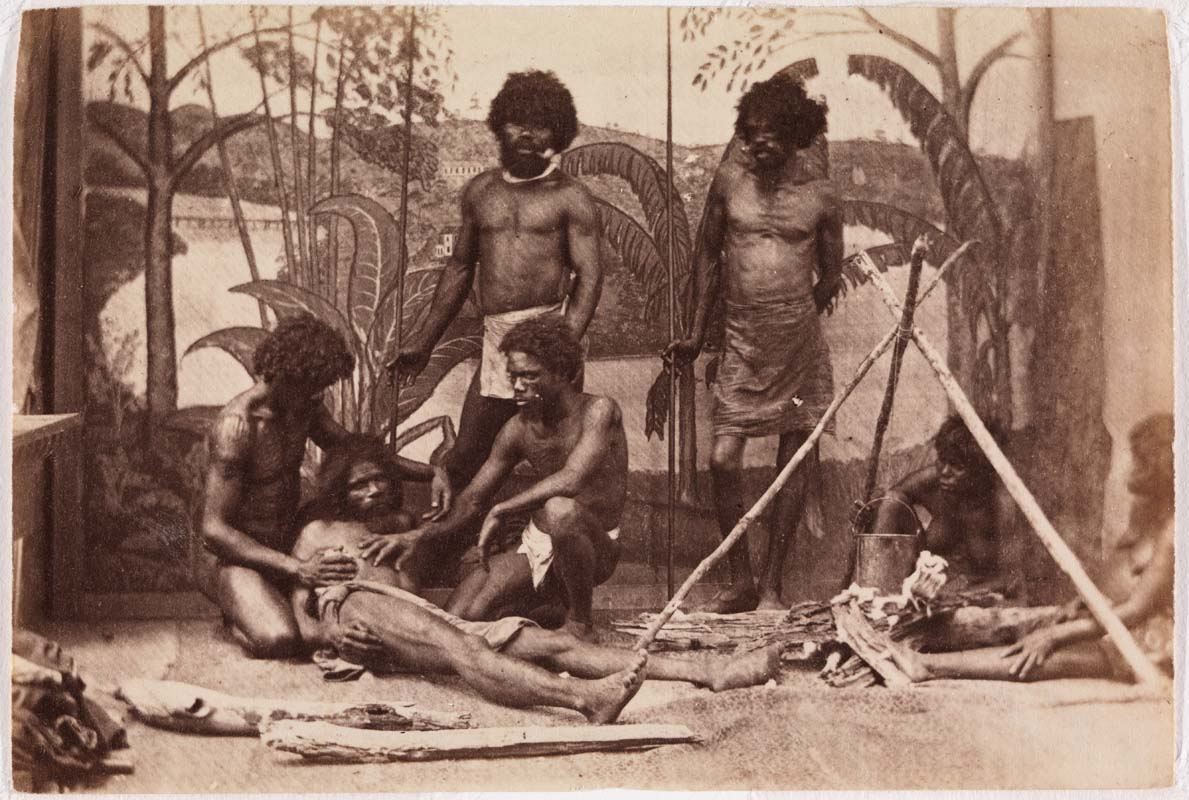
Carte de visite photograph of a group of Indigenous men in front of a painted backdrop of Brisbane scenery by Daniel Marquis, c. 1866

Daniel Marquis (17 May 1829 – 23 January 1879) was a Scottish photographer who worked in Brisbane, Queensland, Australia. He was born in Glasgow where he trained and worked as a photographer from 1855 or earlier. In 1864 he emigrated to the British colony of Queensland and established a studio in Brisbane. There he photographed the colonists, the buildings and townscapes and, most notably, an extensive series of portraits of Indigenous people.

== Early life ==
Daniel Marquis was born on 17 May 1829 in Glasgow, the second child of John Marquis and Isabella Marquis née McGregor, grocers, victuallers and spirit merchants. After leaving school Daniel worked in a cloth warehouse. He married Grace Murray in the Gorbals Parish Church in December 1851 and their first child, Janet Laird Marquis, was born in October 1852. By the time their second child, Isabella McGregor Marquis, was born in November 1855 Daniel was working as a photographer.

== A photographer in Scotland ==
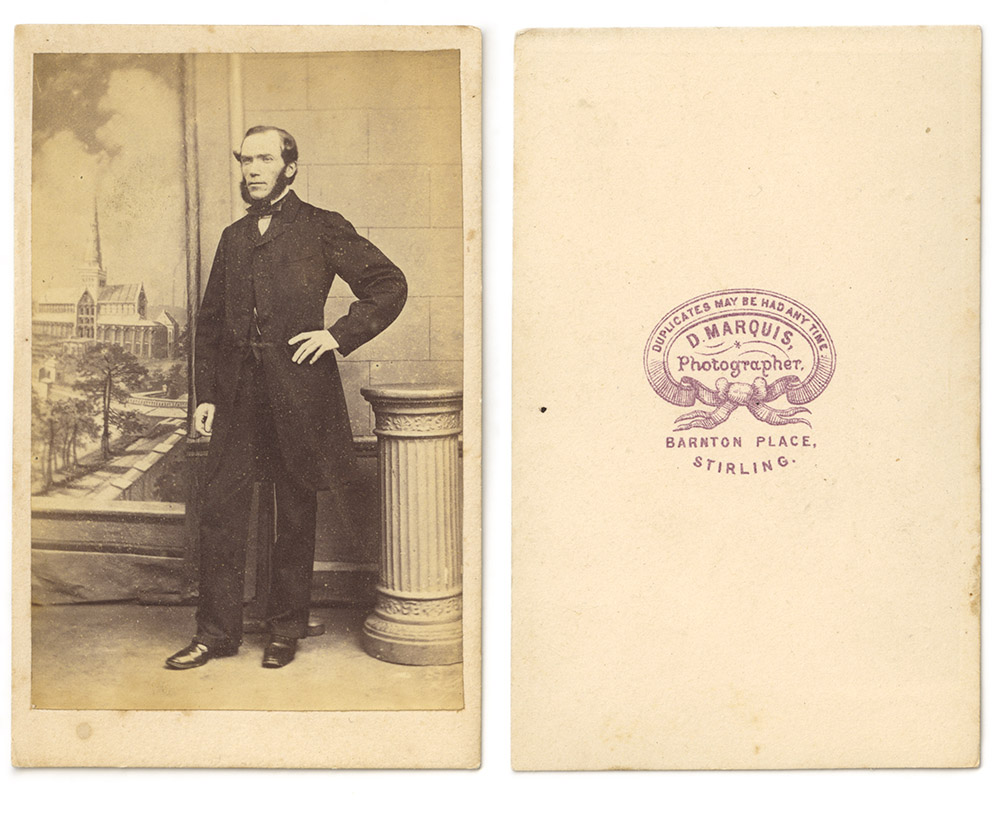
Front and back of a carte-de-visite portrait of a man, taken in Daniel Marquis's studio in Barnton Place, Stirling, c.1863. The subject's formal dress, his stiff pose (supported by a head clamp), and the painted backdrop, are typical features of carte-de-visite portraits.

Daniel probably learned the recently invented collodion wet plate process in one of the small number of photographic studios that were operating in Glasgow in the mid-1850s. He continued to make wet plate negatives and albumen prints throughout his career. By June 1856 he had moved to Grangemouth and opened his own portrait studio. When his son John was born in June 1857 Daniel was recorded as a photographist in Hamilton. The family next moved to Stirling where Daniel had his studio in Mill Lane (from 1858), then in King Street (from 1860), and later in Barnton Place (from 1862). Their eldest child, six-year-old Janet, died in 1858. A second son, James Murray Marquis, was born in Stirling in 1859, and in 1862 a third daughter, Grace Campbell Marquis, was born in 1862 and died three months later. Daniel's wife Grace was sent away to receive care and treatment at Montrose Royal Asylum and Royal Edinburgh Hospital. These events may have prompted the family to leave Scotland.

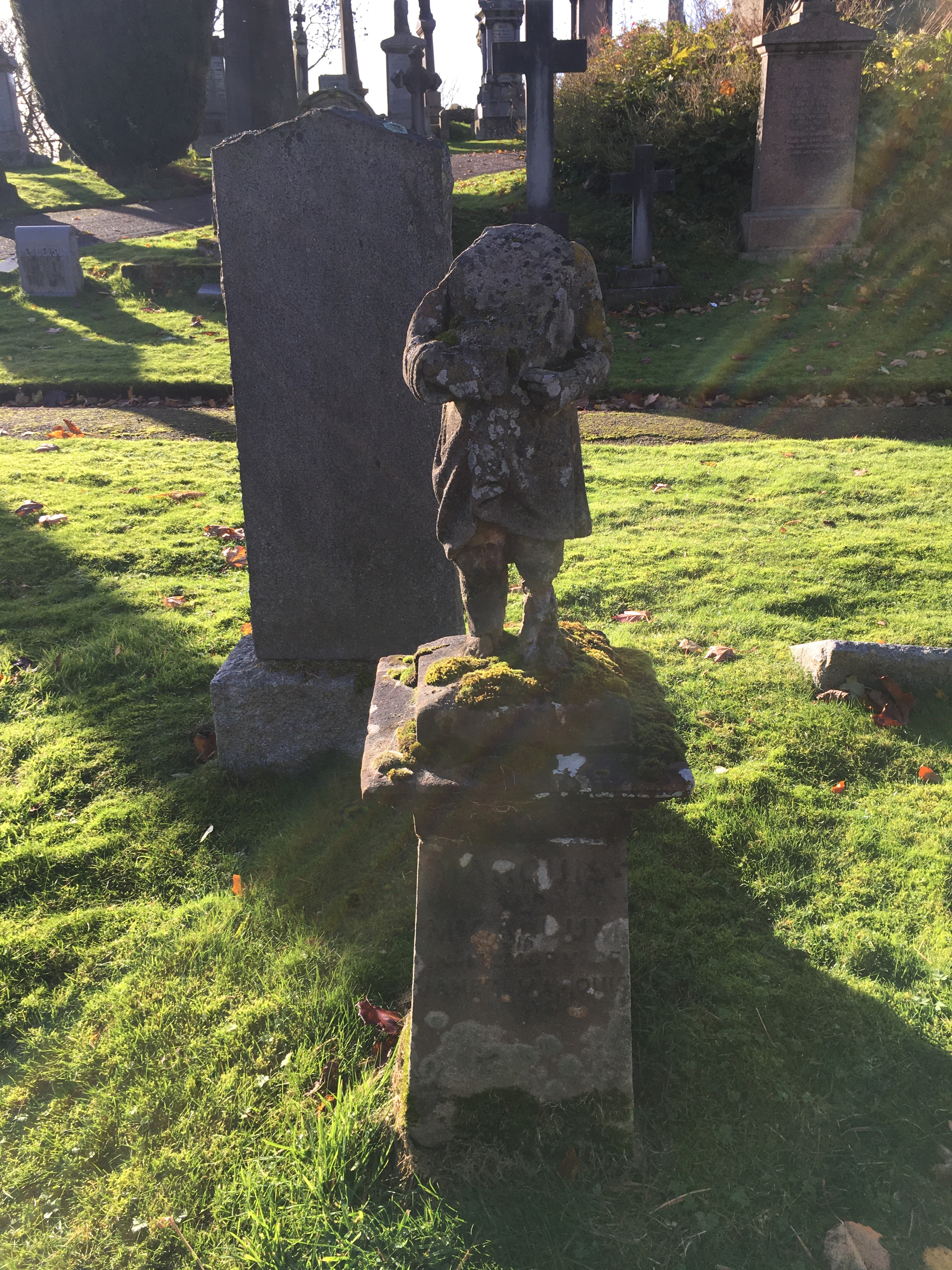
The grave of Grace and Janet Marquis in Stirling.

== A photographer in Queensland ==
In December 1864 Daniel, his wife Grace, their children Isabella, John and James, and Grace's younger sister Margaret departed Gravesend in the immigrant ship Flying Cloud. They arrived in Moreton Bay in March 1865 and settled in Brisbane. By the beginning of 1866 Daniel had opened a studio in rented space in a new building in George Street, Brisbane. In March 1867 he bought a block of land of 26 perches (660 m^{2}) at Lower River Terrace, South Brisbane, where a house was built for the family.

=== Portraits ===
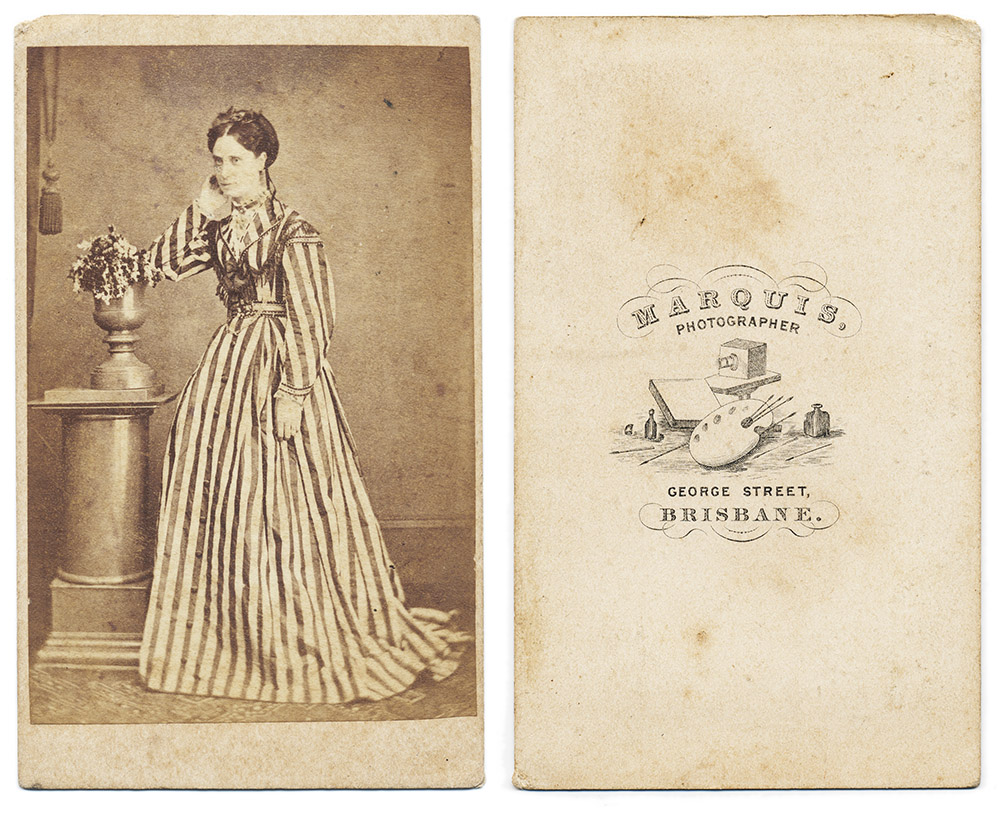
Carte-de-visite portrait of a woman, c.1875

The main business of the studio was portraiture, mostly in the carte-de-visite format. In the glass-roofed operating room behind the building Daniel Marquis made lifelike images of the colonists. He posed his sitters with backdrops, furniture, drapery, head clamps and other accoutrements chosen to present them as handsome and respectable.

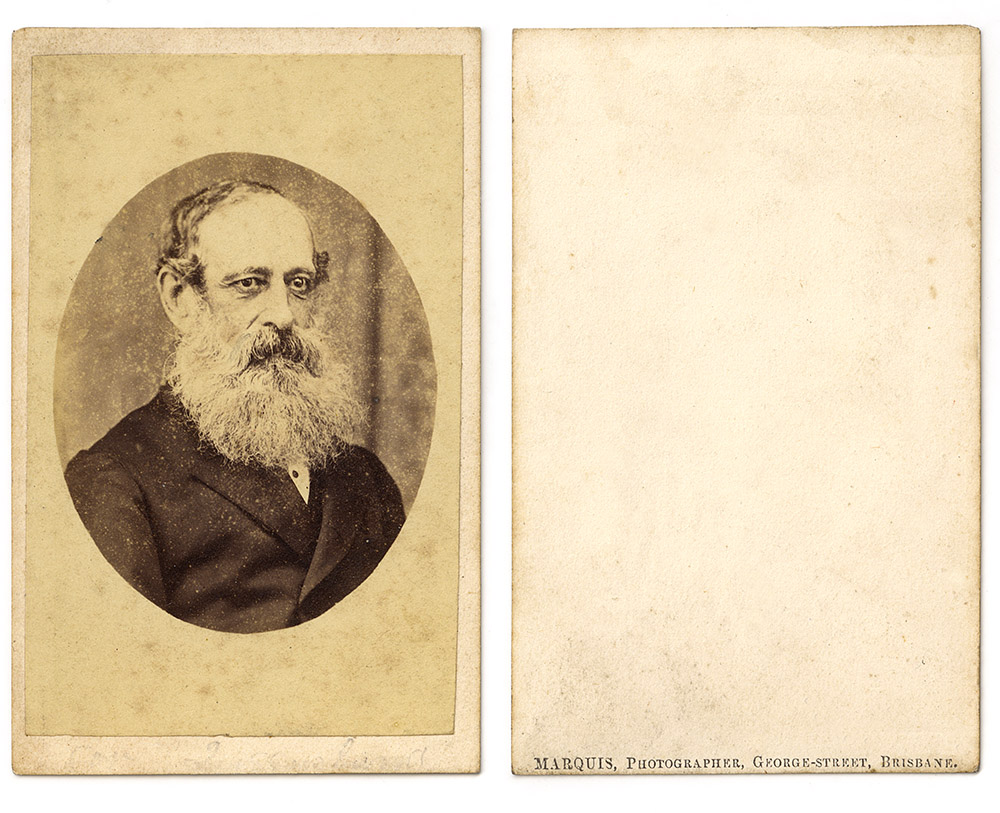
Carte-de-visite portrait of Colonel Blackall, Governor of Queensland 1868–1871, taken in the Brisbane studio, c.1868.

Most of the studio's clients were middle-class colonists—townspeople from Brisbane and squatters and their families from outlying districts. In 1868 Daniel was appointed as photographer by Governor Samuel Blackall, a mark of social and professional approval.

=== Indigenous people ===
Daniel Marquis was the most prolific photographer of Indigenous people in south-east Queensland in the 1860s and 1870s. More than seventy different subjects or poses are known. Daniel made these pictures for sale as stock images, generally in carte-de-visite format, which buyers collected in albums or posted to friends and family in other places. Richard Daintree displayed hand-coloured enlarged prints from Daniel Marquis negatives at the 1872 International Exhibition in London.

Among the buyers of these portraits of Indigenous people were the anthropologist Nicholas Mikluho-Maclay and the specimen collector Amelie Dietrich. Through them and other collectors the photographs were acquired by European ethnographic museums including the Pitt Rivers Museum at Oxford University, the Russian Museum of Anthropology and Ethnography in Saint Petersburg, and the Museum of Archaeology and Anthropology, University of Cambridge.

=== Views ===
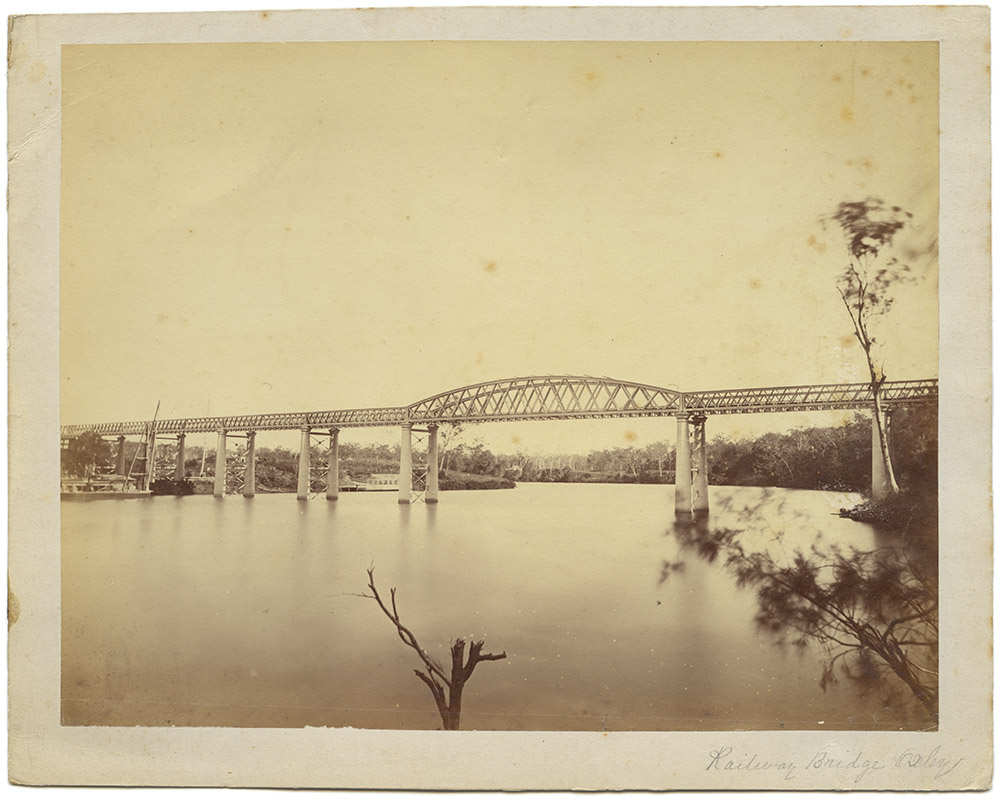
A view of the first Albert Bridge at Indooroopilly, which carried the railway line across the Brisbane River, captured by Daniel Marquis, c.1876. This is an albumen contact print from a 12 x 10 inch plate.

Daniel Marquis offered “views of gentlemen’s residences taken to order” and “stereoscopic and other views of Brisbane and neighbourhood.” He captured many views of places in Brisbane, initially on 8½ x 6½ inch plates (whole-plate size) and, from the mid-1870s, on 12 x 10 inch plates. His customers had the albumen prints framed for display, or collected them in albums, such as one presented to Prince Alfred after his visit to Queensland in 1868. Daniel made a series of multi-plate panoramas from Wickham Terrace and Bowen Terrace that recorded changes in the Brisbane townscape through the 1870s.

== Death and legacy ==
On 23 January 1879 Daniel Marquis died of hepatitis. The Imperial Photo Company bought the business and continued to sell prints from Daniel's negatives, but ceased operating around the middle of 1880.

Photographs by Daniel Marquis survive in private and public collections and provide an evocative record of colonial life in Queensland in the 1860s and 1870s. Notable examples are in the collections of the State Library of Queensland, the Queensland Art Gallery, and the National Gallery of Australia.
