= Transcontinental Hotel =

Heritage-listed hotel in Brisbane, Queensland

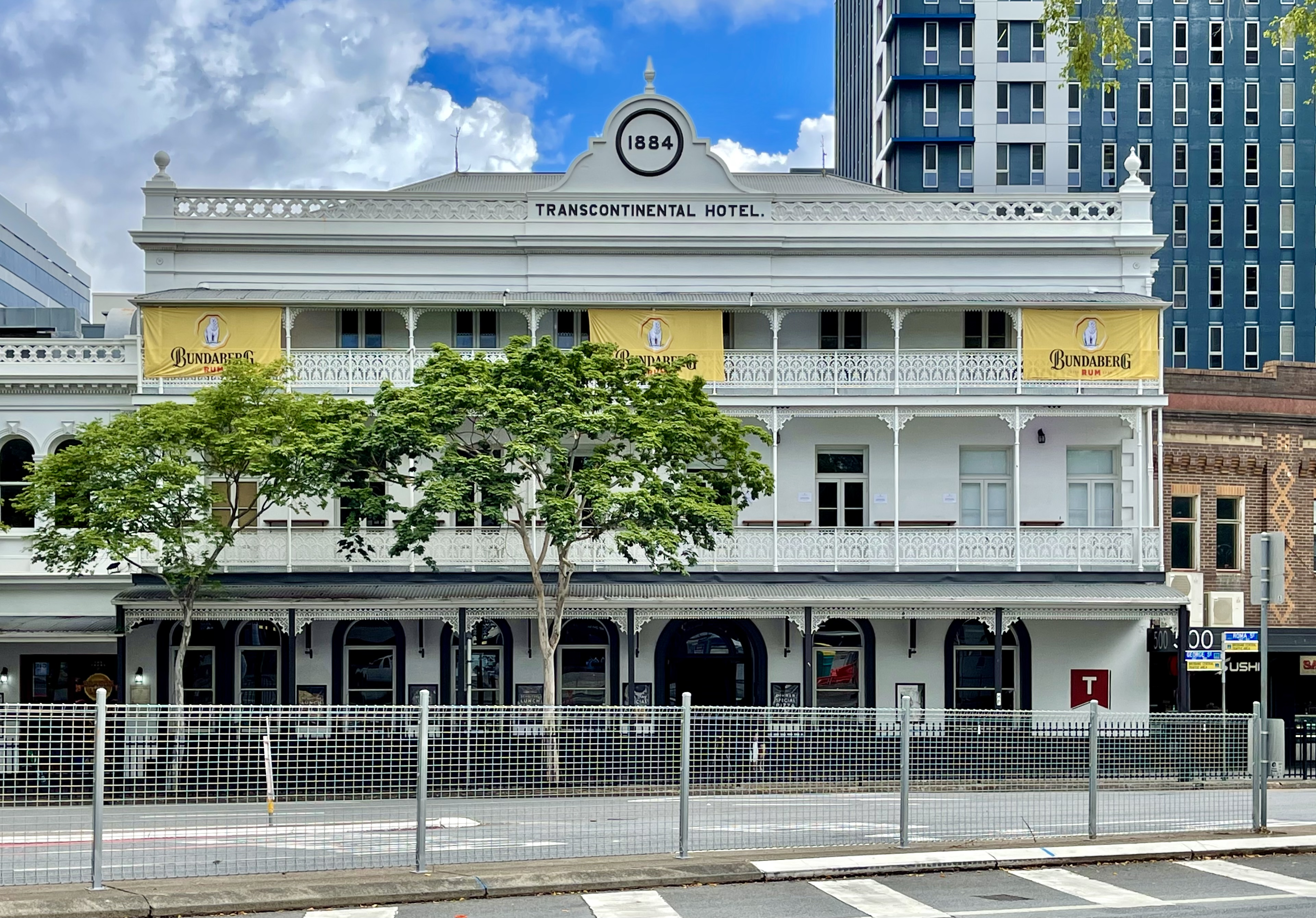
- Transcontinental Hotel, 2021

- Location within Queensland Location within Australia
- 27.4671°S 153.0194°E
- Location: 462–468 George Street, Brisbane City, City of Brisbane, Queensland, Australia

History
- Design period: 1870s–1890s (late 19th century)
- Built: 1883–1884

Site notes
- Architect: Francis Drummond Greville Stanley
- Architectural style: Victorian Filigree

Queensland Heritage Register
- Official name: Transcontinental Hotel
- Type: state heritage (built)
- Designated: 21 October 1992
- Reference no.: 600122
- Significant period: 1881–1884 (fabric); 1884–1935 (historical)

Transcontinental Hotel is a heritage-listed hotel at 462–468 George Street, Brisbane City, City of Brisbane, Queensland, Australia. It was designed by Francis Drummond Greville Stanley and built from 1883 to 1884. It was added to the Queensland Heritage Register on 21 October 1992.

== History ==
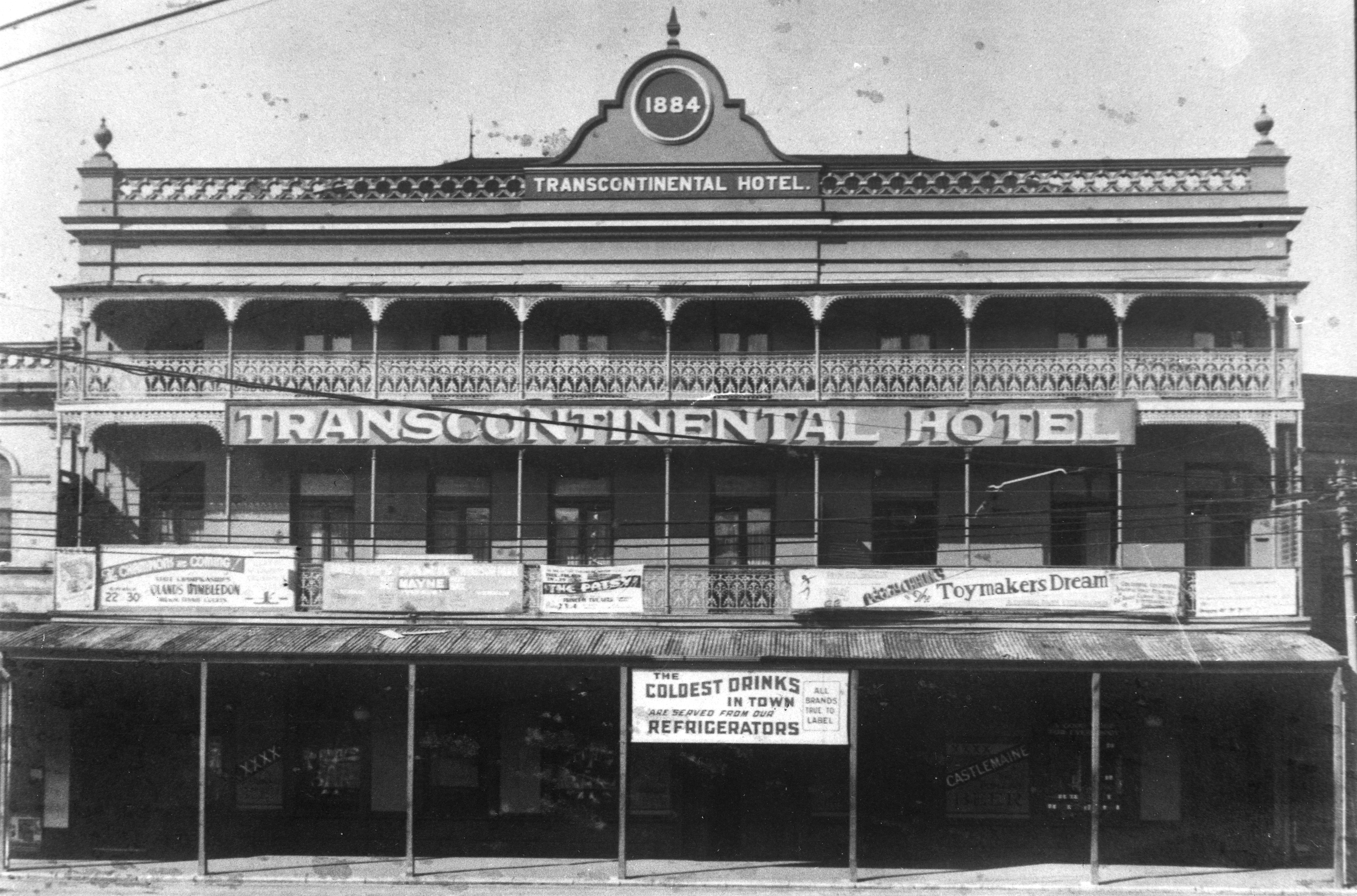
Transcontinental Hotel, circa 1929

The Transcontinental Hotel was constructed in 1883–1884. In 1879 Peter Murphy, wine and spirit merchant, leased premises in George Street from Francois Boudin. In 1881 he acquired the adjoining vacant land. On 28 August 1883 Peter Murphy, then publican and lessee of the Burgundy Hotel, businessman, financier of MacDonnell & East (1901) and Member of the Queensland Legislative Council (MLC, 1904–1922), announced by public notice in The Telegraph his intention to apply for a new publican's license and to build a new hotel on this site. Intended to accommodate passengers from the nearby railway, the Transcontinental Hotel was to comprise "16 bedrooms, 1 dining room, 1 luncheon room, 1 billiard room, 4 sitting rooms, 2 bathrooms, kitchen, store, pantry, cellar and outhouses".

On 22 September 1883 renowned architect Francis Drummond Greville (FDG) Stanley called tenders for the erection of a first class hotel for Peter Murphy. The new hotel, with a frontage of 74 feet (23 m) and a depth of 40 feet (12 m), was four storeys high, one of which was below street level. The Brisbane Courier reported that the Transcontinental Hotel contained 27 bedrooms, seven public rooms, billiard room and a private bar. A sunshade of "ornamental design" was attached to the front and the two upper storeys had balconies four feet, six inches wide, with "ornamental iron columns, brackets, frieze and railings". The hotel offered comfortable accommodation, a first class table, with "all the delicacies of the season being provided". The bar trade was one of the largest in Brisbane, with only the best liquor carried.

In the 1880s, George Street contained most of Brisbane's inner city first-class hotels, including the Bellevue Hotel (1886), Cosmopolitan (1887), Shakespeare (1887–1888), Treasury Hotel (1887–1888), Criterion (c. 1883), Imperial (1885–1886), Lennon's (1883–1884), Grosvenor Hotel (c. 1882), New Crown (188?) and the Transcontinental (1883–1884). Of these, the Treasury, Grosvenor and Transcontinental are the only three to have survived.

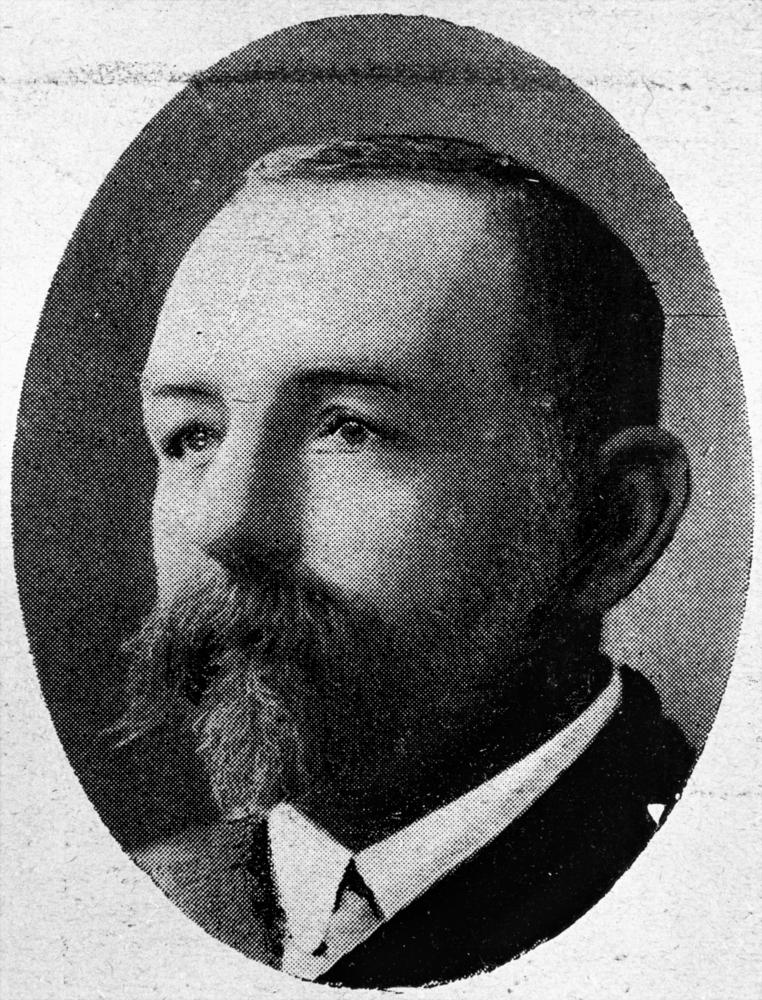
Denis O'Connor, 1906

In 1906 new lessee Denis O'Connor commissioned architect, George Henry Male Addison to design extensive alterations to the interior. At the opening ceremony of the new bar on 30 October 1906 the Transcontinental was declared to be "the most ornate and best equipped" hotel in Australia. In 1925 the hotel was further remodelled as part of Peter Murphy's redevelopment plans for upper George Street as a commercial precinct. Murphy's business acumen was realised by 1926 when upper George Street was declared to be "one of the most flourishing business" sectors outside of Queen Street and Fortitude Valley.

The Murphy family owned the Transcontinental Hotel until 1935 when it was sold to Castlemaine Perkins. The McCoy family were licensees from the 1930s until the 1980s. In 1988 the hotel owners, Austotel, commissioned Hampton Interiors to restore the Transcontinental. The ornate cast iron balustrading which was removed in 1965, was reinstated and the original exterior colours were repainted.

== Description ==
This Victorian era hotel located near the intersection of George and Roma Streets features filigree cast iron lacework that has recently been reinstated onto the original cast iron verandah posts. It is of rendered brick construction with three storeys on the George Street facade and a fourth level basement. The basement walls are Brisbane Tuff stonework. The George Street facade has a post supported curved corrugated iron awning over the footpath, and balconies on the upper two levels. Eight pairs of French-lights open onto the balconies on each level. The first floor is emphasised by having a greater balcony height than the top floor. The topmost balcony has a curved corrugated iron roof hipped at the ends.

The building is crowned with a decorative parapet which includes the name "TRANSCONTINENTAL HOTEL" in raised lettering and a curved central parapet section bearing the date 1884 in a circular recess.

Although the building has been restored externally, its internal refurbishment, involving the removal of fittings and the creation of a large internal space, does not convey the impression of a Victorian Hotel. Its prominent location and the intact nature of its external Victorian detailing make this building a notable landmark in this area of Brisbane.

== Heritage listing ==
Transcontinental Hotel was listed on the Queensland Heritage Register on 21 October 1992 having satisfied the following criteria.

The place is important in demonstrating the evolution or pattern of Queensland's history.

Built near Roma Street railway station, the Transcontinental Hotel is important in illustrating the important role of hotels in providing accommodation for Queensland travellers in the late 19th century. It also provides rare surviving evidence of the former importance of George Street as a late 19th century accommodation precinct.

The place is important in demonstrating the principal characteristics of a particular class of cultural places.

The Transcontinental is a typical example of an 1880s era boom era hotel in Brisbane's central business district, displaying filigree cast iron lacework and a post supported street awning.

The place is important because of its aesthetic significance.

It has aesthetic significance as a prominent part of the streetscape at the intersection of George and Roma Streets.

The place has a special association with the life or work of a particular person, group or organisation of importance in Queensland's history.

The Transcontinental Hotel is significant for its strong association with Peter Murphy, Member of the Legislative Council, publican and George Street property speculator, from 1881 until 1925.
