= Daniel Marques (Portuguese footballer) =

Portuguese footballer

Personal information
- Full name: José Daniel Silva Marques
- Date of birth: 28 September 1987 (age 39)
- Place of birth: Vila Nova de Famalicão, Portugal
- Height: 1.80 m (5 ft 11 in)
- Position: Defender

Youth career
- 1999–2003: Famalicão
- 2003–2005: Porto
- 2006: Braga

Senior career*
Years	Team	Apps	(Gls)
2006–2011	Joane		
2011–2014	Ribeirão	66	(1)
2014–2018	Famalicão	96	(6)
2011-14	Ribeirão	2	(0)
2014-2018	Familcão	81	(4)
2018-2019	No club		
2019-	Retired		
Total		83	(4)
- * Club domestic league appearances and goals as of 12:55,1October 2024 (UTC)

José Daniel Silva Marques, known as Daniel Marques (born 28 September 1987) is a former Portuguese football player who last played for Ribeirão.

== Club career ==
He made his professional debut in the Segunda Liga for Famalicão on 9 August 2015 in a game against Varzim.

On 31 January 2019, Marques joined Ribeirão.

He later retired in 2019
