= Rockhampton Courthouse =

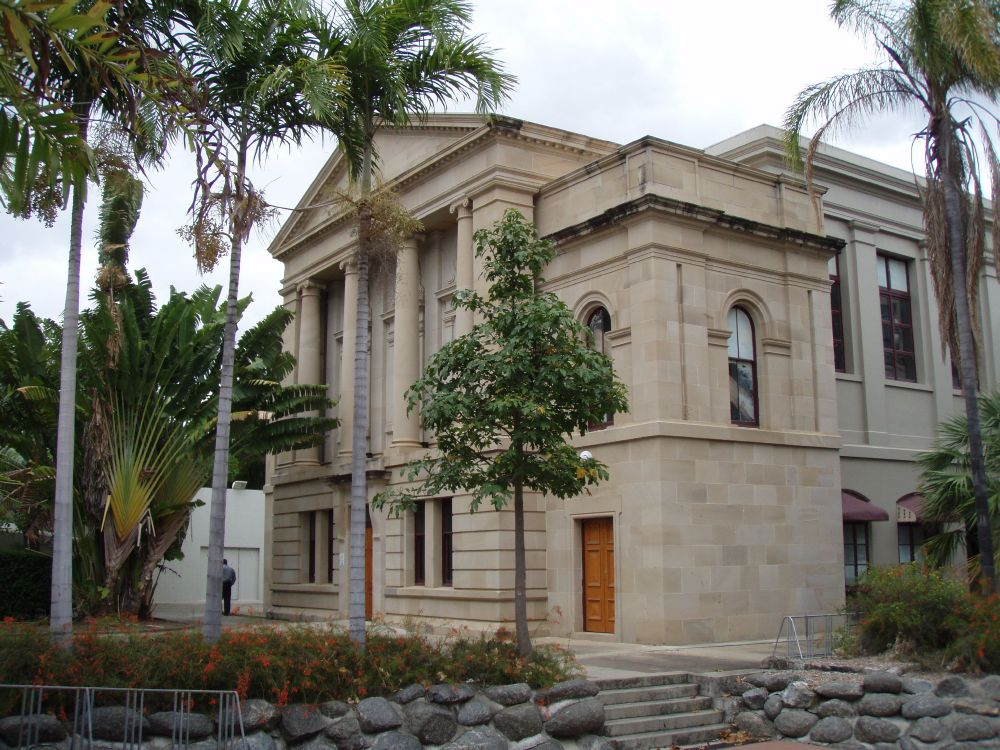
- Rockhampton Supreme Court

- Location within Queensland Location within Australia
- 23.3773°S 150.512°E
- Location: 42 East Street, Rockhampton, Rockhampton Region, Queensland, Australia

History
- Design period: 1940s–1960s (post-World War II)
- Built: 1950–1955

Site notes
- Architect: John Hitch
- Architectural style: Modernism

Queensland Heritage Register
- Official name: Rockhampton Court and Administrative Complex, District Court (State Government Savings Bank, Commonwealth, Magistrate's Court (Police Court), Supreme Court
- Type: state heritage (landscape, built)
- Designated: 21 October 1992
- Reference no.: 600795
- Significant period: 1880s ongoing (social); 1880s, 1891, 1910s, 1930s (historical); 1886–1930s (fabric sup ct); 1915–1930
- Significant components: office/s, garden/grounds, court house, bank

Rockhampton Courthouse is a heritage-listed courthouse at 42 East Street, Rockhampton, Rockhampton Region, Queensland, Australia. It was designed by John Hitch and built from 1950 to 1955. It is also known as District Court, Queensland Government Savings Bank, Commonwealth Bank, Magistrate's Court, Police Court, and Supreme Court. It was added to the Queensland Heritage Register on 21 October 1992.

== History ==
The Rockhampton Courthouse complex comprises the Supreme Court building (Block D 1886–87), Magistrate's Court building (Block B, former Police Court building 1934–1936), District Court building (Block C, former Queensland Government Savings Bank and Commonwealth Bank, 1915–16 and 1932–1933), Family Services' building (Block F, former Labour Bureau 1934–36), and the Bolsover Street Government Office building (Block E, 1950–55), which all form part of a significant group of buildings on the Government Reserve bounded by Fitzroy, East and Bolsover Streets, Rockhampton. The buildings all reflect the involvement of the Queensland Government in the development of the City of Rockhampton from the colonial period until the present day, in various areas such as the administration of justice, and the provision of government services within Rockhampton.

After the short lived Canoona gold rush of 1858, Rockhampton was proclaimed as a town and declared a "port of entry" in 1858. The first sale of town allotments was held in Rockhampton on 17 and 18 November 1858. In 1859 Queensland separated from New South Wales, and at this time Brisbane became the base of the Supreme Court of Queensland. The Supreme Court provided sittings for circuit towns that included Ipswich, Drayton and Maryborough.

Rockhampton became a circuit town for the Supreme Court in 1863. In 1859 residents had petitioned for the provision of a court house in the new town. A site for a court house had been reserved fronting onto Quay Street in 1859–1860. However, community agitation was responsible for the establishment of a more central reserve for a court house and lock up on five acres of land bounded by Bolsover, East and Fitzroy Streets. It was on this central reserve that the court houses of Rockhampton were to be built.

=== Original Court House (Block A, demolished 1978) ===
A court house was built in 1861–1862 on the corner of East and Fitzroy Streets. The total cost of the building was £1,130. The architect was Charles Tiffin (1833–73), who also designed such notable buildings as Parliament House in Brisbane, the Old Courthouse in Ipswich, and Old Government House in Brisbane.

The completed two-storeyed building was constructed of masonry and had an L-shape plan. The building was described as being of arcaded Italianate style. Valances to both levels were constructed as timber framed segmental arches, and a single-storeyed court room was provided, with ancillary spaces. Stables and associated outbuildings were also provided.

Bowen had been made the home of the northern district Court in 1874. Rockhampton therefore had to be served by a judge on circuit from Brisbane. In 1881 a larger and more substantial Bowen Courthouse was erected, which caused anger amongst the citizens of Rockhampton, who felt that Rockhampton was deserving of the appointment of its own judge, and the establishment of a Supreme Court.

The first Rockhampton Court House served the community of Rockhampton until the 1880s. At this time the discovery of gold at Mount Morgan, in the Dee Range some forty kilometres from Rockhampton, transformed the town. A major building boom occurred in Rockhampton as the wealth of the mine was shipped through the river port. As the boom was to continue into the early part of the twentieth century, the wealth generated was to create other major forms of public buildings in Rockhampton. These included the Rockhampton Customs House, Rockhampton Post Office, and the 1887 Supreme Court building.

The Tiffin Court House was replaced with an even more imposing building for the Court in 1887. The Tiffin Court House continued to serve as a Court building and then administration office building until 1969, when new purpose built offices were provided for the State Government in East Street. The Tiffin Court House was demolished in 1978.

=== Supreme Court Building (Block D, 1886–87) ===
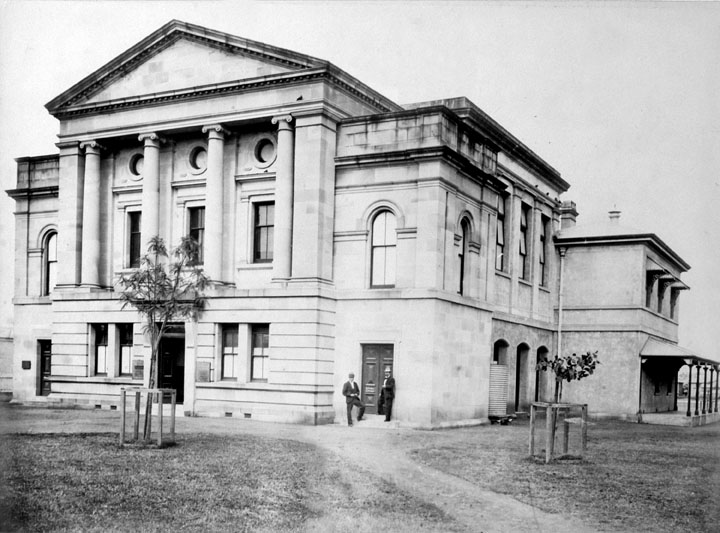
Rockhampton Supreme Court, corner East and Fitzroy Streets, Rockhampton, circa 1890

The booming economy of the Rockhampton region was to find an expression of its wealth in the public buildings constructed in the period of 1885–1910. An example of this is the Supreme Court building.

With the growth in population in Rockhampton and central Queensland, the Tiffin-designed court house was found to be inadequate to the demands being placed on it by the community. A petition had been put before the Minister for Works in October 1882, for a new Supreme Court house for Rockhampton. The Morning Bulletin, 4 October 1882 envisaged a "handsome capacious edifice in the northern part of the town... two storey's high, of Stanwell sandstone".

To accommodate the increased needs of the judiciary a replacement court house was under design in the period of 1884. The architect of the second Court building was John James Clark, (1838–1915). Clark had been born in Liverpool in England, and attended the Collegiate Institute in Liverpool, where he was trained in architectural drawing. In 1853 his family emigrated to Victoria during the gold rush era. Clark had begun his career as an architect with the Office of the Victorian Colonial Architect. In 1881 he moved to New South Wales where he designed the Town Halls for Orange and Waverley in Sydney.

In 1883 Clark was appointed Queensland Colonial Architect. His best known public building was the Brisbane Treasury Building designed in 1883. Clark was dismissed from the Office of Colonial Architect in 1885. During the period that he was Colonial Architect Clark was responsible for the design of several Court Houses in Queensland including Charters Towers Courthouse, Mackay Courthouse, and the Rockhampton Court House (1885–87).

He was also responsible for other notable public buildings throughout Queensland, such as the Yungaba Immigration Centre in Brisbane, Townsville Post Office and following his dismissal was responsible for the design of the Lady Norman Wing, Brisbane Children's Hospital, and the Townsville railway station.

The sketch design was heavily criticised by local members of the Queensland Legislative Assembly, as well as by the Rockhampton Police Magistrate. Both criticised the new court house design as not allowing for a multiplying population of Rockhampton. The design was also criticised as not providing enough office space, and appearing to be designed more for a country court house than for a growing major centre of population. Revised drawings were prepared as a result of these complaints.

Initially the proposal had been made to locate the new court house building on the Rockhampton immigration depot, away from the reserve on East Street. Clark's design for the riverfront court house was to be basically unchanged when the new building's location was changed to sit adjacent to the 1861–1862 court house on the Government Reserve, away from Quay Street.

Pressure was brought to bear on the Minister for Works to relocate the court house to the centre of Rockhampton from various groups, including the Chamber of Commerce. It was felt by such groups that the new court house should stand at a site close to the centre of town, and therefore help to improve the appearance of the town centre. The result of such pressure saw the court house located to its present place, in the centre of the reserve for government buildings.

Tenders were called for the construction of the new court house on 8 October 1885. Thomas Matthews was awarded the contract, for a total of £12,533. The tender documents also called for an alternate price should the whole external fabric of the building be constructed in stone. The option was not taken up. The tender was approved on 11 December 1885.

Construction took eighteen months. The 1887 Annual Report of the Department of Public Works announced:

Completed, under contract with T. Matthews, for the sum of exclusive of furnishings, of £12,533. This building is two storey's in height, built of brick, cemented, the front being of freestone. On the first floor is provided the court, with judge's, jury, witness, and other rooms. In the basement is provided strong room, prisoner's cell, and general office's for the transaction of Court business.

The Court House was further described in the Brisbane Courier of January 1893 as being a "gloomy, sombre looking" building.

The first half yearly sitting of the Circuit Court was held in September 1887, but there was no official dedication ceremony. This was a further slight to the residents of Rockhampton, who were now advocating for the appointment of a Supreme Court Judge. The new Court House was still to be served from Brisbane. A second judge was appointed to the northern district in 1889, however the home of the Northern Court was relocated at that time from Bowen to Townsville.

The Rockhampton Courthouse became the focus of both state and national attention in May 1891, as a result of the shearer's strike of February–March of that year. Early in 1891 the central Queensland towns of Barcaldine, Clermont, Winton and Springsure had been the centre points of the strike, which had arisen over the signing of agreements between pastoralists and members of unions representing the interests of bush workers. Police, volunteer members of the Queensland armed forces and Special Constables had been despatched from Rockhampton, Brisbane and other centres to the central Queensland pastoral districts. Shearers formed themselves into large camps, at Capella, Clermont and Barcaldine.

The government pressed for a judicial solution to the strike and proceeded to arrest strike leaders in March 1891. Most of those arrested were acquitted; however fourteen shearers alleged to have been strike leaders, were charged with conspiracy. The conspiracy trial was held in the Rockhampton Court House in May 1891. Twelve were found guilty and sentenced to three years prison.

Unable to succeed through direct strike action, the labour movement was to seek social reform and change through political methods, the result of which was the formation of the Labor Party. The party began contesting parliamentary seats in 1893.

The Court House was finally elevated to the status of having a resident Supreme Court judge in 1896. This was a result of the passing of The Supreme Court Act of 1895. Five Supreme Court judges were appointed, three in Brisbane and one each in Rockhampton and Townsville. The Central Supreme Court was established in January 1896. The Police Magistrates Court was forced to relocate back to the Tiffin-designed court house. It was not until 1935 that a purpose building was to be provided for the Police Court.

The interior of the building was carpeted in 1896. In 1908 a new strong room was provided on the ground floor of the building, which lead to the removal of a staircase. A wall was also removed in the titles and stamps office to open up the existing office space, and a new counter was provided for dealing with the public.

Further alterations were made to the building in 1922, with the removal of a brick wall in what had been the Clerk Petty Sessions General Office. Concrete steps were provided on to a verandah on the northern side of the building. Other partitions were removed to open out space, and windows were installed.

Other alterations were made to the building in 1933 in association with the provision of sewering the entire site, and the construction of the adjacent toilet block. A toilet, bath and wash basins were provided on the upper storey for the Judge's room, and the jury room.

The Supreme Court building at the present time contains the Supreme Court, Supreme/District Court Registry, Legal Library, and associated ancillary services for the staff and general public.

Since the Central Supreme Court was inaugurated in 1896, it has remained the only Supreme Court in residence in Queensland in its original setting and building. The Brisbane Supreme Court building, designed by FDG Stanley in 1879, burnt down in 1968. The Northern Supreme Court in Townsville, relocated from Bowen in 1889, moved into an adapted School of Arts, and was provided with a purpose built Court House in 1975. The Rockhampton Court House is the only one to maintain its connection with its place of inauguration. Although designed as a Court House for the Brisbane Circuit, it was intended for it to be the home of a Supreme Court.

=== District Court (Block C, 1915–16, 1932–33) ===
A Rockhampton branch of the Queensland Queensland Government Savings Bank was first proposed in 1914. Tenders for the erection of a new building to be built on the government reserve closed on 28 June 1914. In 1915 construction began on the new Queensland Government Savings Bank. £2,685 was allocated by the State Government for the construction of the Savings Bank. The design of the Queensland Government Savings Bank was supervised by Alfred Barton Brady and Thomas Pye of the Works Department. AB Brady and Thomas Pye were also responsible for overseeing other notable buildings in Rockhampton, including the Customs House.

The completion date was expected to be 1916. The building of the Queensland Government Savings Bank was the first major construction work undertaken on the Government Reserve since the erection of the Supreme Court building in 1885–1887. The bank building was to be one of the few purpose built Queensland Government Savings Bank buildings in Queensland. Other Government Savings Banks were also built in Brisbane and Toowoomba. The Brisbane Office, constructed on the corner of George and Elizabeth Streets, was completed in the period of 1914–1922. It survives at the present time as the Family Services Building.

The construction of the Queensland Government Savings Bank was a result of the initiative of the Ted Theodore Government. State enterprises were to be an important element of the social and political platforms of the Labor Party. This included intervention in the economy, especially through the provision of a wide range of products to allow for lower prices for goods and services.

The Queensland Government Savings Bank had been formed in 1916 with the amalgamation of the Government Savings Bank, Agricultural Bank and the Workers Dwelling Board under The Queensland Government Savings Bank Act 1916. The new bank would compete in the economy utilising the same market approach as the private banks.

The Queensland Government Savings Bank functioned as a separate financial identity until 1920, when the businesses and assets of the State Bank were transferred over to the Commonwealth Bank. Under this transfer to Commonwealth control, the state was to be able to borrow larger funds from the Commonwealth body.

The Commonwealth Bank took possession of the building in 1920, relocating from the previous rented premises at 74 East Street in Rockhampton. In the 1930s there was a demand for enlarged and improved accommodation for the Commonwealth Bank in Rockhampton. The building was considerably enlarged in the 1932–1933 period. The expansion of the Commonwealth Bank building added new facades to the exterior.

An air-conditioning plant room was added in 1975. The building continued as a banking establishment until 1986 when it was purchased by the State Government, to alleviate overcrowding. The building was converted to house the District Court and associated staff, and general facilities for the use of the public and staff members of the Court.

=== Magistrate's Court (Block B, 1934–36) ===
With the enlarging and extending of the former Queensland Government Savings Bank being completed, an additional Court building was constructed by the Queensland Government. The new Police Court building design was part of a projected townscape of buildings on the Government Reserve, to complement the design of the Commonwealth Bank building. The Police Court building was also built in response to the impact of the depression on the local community.

The construction of the building was viewed as one of three possible projects to alleviate the unemployment problem in Rockhampton, decided on by a committee consisting of the ALP, Unions, and unemployed workers. A deputation from the committee to the Attorney General led to the approval being given for construction of the building in late 1933. The local Labor member for Rockhampton, James Larcombe, MLA, was an ardent supporter of the initiative.

The facade of the new Court was designed specifically to complement the Commonwealth Bank building. Construction of the building was begun in 1934 and completed in 1936. The Annual Report for the Department of Public Works, 1934 gave the following description:

This building, which will be of concrete and brick construction with cement finish externally and tile roof, will provide accommodation for the Police Court and officials connected therewith. The main facade, facing East street, is designed with portico to match the neighbouring building of the Commonwealth Bank, and together with the Supreme Court, should complete a pleasing architectural group... accommodation will be provided for the Clerk of Petty Sessions and his staff, together with strong rooms, and also the Police Magistrate.... In rear approached from entrance drive to the Supreme Court, will be situated the new court room... with verandahs on either side and at rear, and with rooms for solicitors and witnesses... Altogether, the building when completed, should be an asset to the already long list of handsome buildings erected in this city.

Estimated cost of construction was to be £7,825. The colour for the Police Court building was also chosen so as to blend in with the Commonwealth Bank. At the same time new police buildings and courthouses were being erected in Mackay, Dalby and Toowoomba. The Police Court was accommodated in this building until being altered to its present arrangement as a Magistrate's Court in 1991.

=== Family Services' Building (Block F, 1934–36) ===
The present Family Services' building was constructed as part of the project to provide employment in Queensland through the capital works building programme of the Forgan-Smith government.

The Department of Public Works described the new building as being part of a continuing development of the Supreme Court site designed and constructed in sympathy with the neighbouring Commonwealth Bank building:

This building, of brick and concrete construction, with tile roof, will replace the existing wood and brick structure, and provide central accommodation for officials of the Department of Labour and Industry. Architecturally, it is treated in a similar manner to the Police Court now under construction in East street. The building will accommodate Labour Agent, General Office, Clerks, Female Labour Agent, Travelling inspector, and will have necessary lavatory accommodation.

Estimated cost of construction was to be £4,584. Work began in 1934 and was completed in 1936. The Labour Bureau was constructed to be one of two buildings designed to front onto Bolsover Street. The design was by the Queensland Department of Public Works under the control of Andrew Baxter Leven (1885–1966). Leven at this period was Chief Architect and Quantity Surveyor for the Department of Works, a position he held from 1933 until 1951.

The Labour Bureau building was sited so as to provide a court related to the rear facade of the Supreme Court building. The second building, intended to complement the Labour Bureau building was not constructed. Additional offices for the Bureau were to be eventually included in the Bolsover Street Government Offices. All of the public buildings on the Supreme Court site were further modernised with the installation of a sewerage system in 1933.

=== Bolsover Street Government Office Building (Block E, 1950–55) ===
Construction of the Bolsover Street Government Office building was necessitated by the increased accommodation requirements of various Government Departments in Rockhampton after the Second World War, partly as a result of a policy of decentralisation. Previously, accommodation was supplied by a two storeyed former fire station on the Government Reserve. However, it was felt that this accommodation was not appropriate or in keeping with the remainder of public buildings on the Supreme Court site .

Shortages of building materials, as well as architects and technical officers to design and supervise building works, were experienced in the post-war years. The Bolsover Street Government Office building was designed in 1949 by English architect Harold John Hitch (known as John Hitch), and the building was constructed from 1950 to 1955.

After working with well known firms in the United Kingdom and service with the R.A.F. John Hitch (b. 26 June 1915), and his Danish wife, emigrated to Australia to take up a position with the Architectural Branch of the Queensland Public Works Department in Brisbane on 6 February 1948. Hitch had qualified in London in 1938, and after the war in 1946 had spent approximately 12 weeks in Denmark and Sweden, and had seen some of what he considered the best pre-war Scandinavian architecture which would have a strong influence on his architectural aesthetic and design philosophy. John Hitch was one of approximately six British architects, appointed by the Queensland Government for a 3-year contract, who arrived with their families during 1947–1948. The Queensland Government paid for passage and relocation costs, and initially accommodation was provided at the Yungaba Immigration Depot, Kangaroo Point. Several of these architects broke their contracts and moved interstate or back to the United Kingdom due to dissatisfaction with their conditions of professional appointment, and living and climatic conditions.

In March 1950 Hitch was promoted to Designing Architect Division 1, a position he held until he resigned in April 1951 after completing his three-year contract to set up practice with Theo Thynne. In 1954 Hitch established an independent practice, and was commissioned to design a new Court House for Bundaberg, constructed 1956–1957, which was described in 1957 Annual Report of the Department of Public Works as:

A stone building which captures the quality, dignity and prestige expected in a court-house building and yet remains essentially a product of the present day.

Hitch was also appointed to the staff of the Architecture School of the University of Queensland as a part-time lecturer in c.1949. At this time, the school was located adjacent to Parliament House in George Street, Brisbane, and classes were held in the evenings and comprised University and Technical College students. Eventually the school separated with its move to the St Lucia campus in May 1956. Hitch had also lectured on the influence of Scandinavian design on British architecture to members of the R.A.I.A. Brisbane Chapter.

In 1956 Hitch entered private practice with Ian Sinnamon, working on a variety of civic and commercial buildings. He also played a prominent role within the Queensland Chapter of the R.A.I.A. until he moved to Melbourne in 1958, where remained for the rest of his career. As a member of the publications committee of the Queensland Chapter of the R.A.I.A., Hitch was involved in the publication of Buildings of Queensland, published by Jacaranda Press in 1959 as a centennial record of architecture in Queensland.

Hitch was also responsible for the design and construction of a demountable travelling exhibition which displayed the activities of the Public Works Department, conceived as a bold public relations exercise. It was first displayed at the Royal National Show, and was later transported by rail to regional centres. Other exhibitions designed by Hitch include three Queensland Industries Fairs from 1949, the 1952 R.A.I.A. Convention in Brisbane City Hall, and the Architecture in Australia exhibition at the Royal Institute of British Architects, Portland Place, London from 28 February to 24 March 1956.

For the Bolsover Street site, John Hitch obtained through chief engineer Mr Kindler site survey information including flood level projections used for the construction of the nearby Fitzroy River Bridge. Hitch designed three schemes for submission to the Queensland Cabinet, the first being a ten-storey tower fronting Fitzroy Street, the second being two four to five storey blocks facing East and Bolsover Streets, and the third being a three-storey U-shaped development fronting the three streets. The first and third schemes emphasised the Queensland Government presence on the approach to the new Fitzroy River Bridge. Cabinet opted for the larger site coverage of the third smaller scaled alternative, and approval was given to proceed with one wing to the Bolsover Street frontage. A model of the U-shaped development was constructed, which John Hitch believes was the first architectural model in Queensland.

The office block replaced an earlier scheme for a second stage of building intended for the Labour Bureau. The first stage had been the adjacent 1934–1936 Labour Bureau building. The Government Office building was constructed as the first wing of a proposed U-shaped building, with frontages to Bolsover, Fitzroy and East Streets, which would have established a courtyard around the Supreme Court house while maintaining the axial vistas to Bolsover and East Streets.

In 1950 work commenced on the three-storeyed building, which was constructed of reinforced concrete with brick and stone facings. Estimated cost of the building was to be £175,000. Due to site conditions, reinforced concrete piers were driven to the basalt bed, and reinforced concrete perimeter beams were laid and detailed to read as a plinth to the building. The architect was not able to supervise the works, and the concrete perimeter beam was incorrectly stopped horizontally between pours. The Government policy of using direct labour on its building projects was handled entirely by the Construction Branch, and on-site visits by architects were rare and were discouraged. As a result of the faulty concrete pour, Hitch was directed to the site to arrange for the faulty work to be removed and the concrete repoured.

The building was constructed with a curtain wall of metal-framed glazing with stone spandrel panels divided by regularly spaced vertical concrete aggregate fins framed by brickwork to the main street frontage. The aggregate fins were designed to have horizontal metal sunhoods which were not installed.

Satisfactory progress on the work was reported in the period 1951–1953. It was anticipated that the building would be in partial occupation from the beginning of 1954, and the entire project completed by the middle of 1954. In its 1955 Annual Report, the Department of Public Works stated:

Early in the year the new block of offices in Rockhampton was completed and relieved the accommodation problem in the city.

When completed, the building was much admired by the architectural student community, providing a local example of the architectural aesthetic promoted by journals such as the Architectural Review. The building was one of the first substantial public buildings built by the department after the Second World War, and demonstrated a radical change in design philosophy.

Internal refits were carried out in 1960, 1969, 1976 and 1984, but much of the original fabric remains intact. The remaining wings of the design were not completed. The Office building supplied the needs of the various Departments in Rockhampton until 1969 when new buildings were built away from the Government Reserve.

== Description ==
The Rockhampton Courthouse complex, containing the Supreme Court, Magistrate's Court, District Court, Family Services' building and Government Office building, is located on a level site bound on three sides by East, Fitzroy and Bolsover Streets. The site is prominently located within the city centre at the entrance to the East Street mall, and adjacent to the approach to the Fitzroy Bridge leading to North Rockhampton. The Magistrate's Court, District Court and Family Services' building have been designed in a similar architectural style.

=== Supreme Court ===
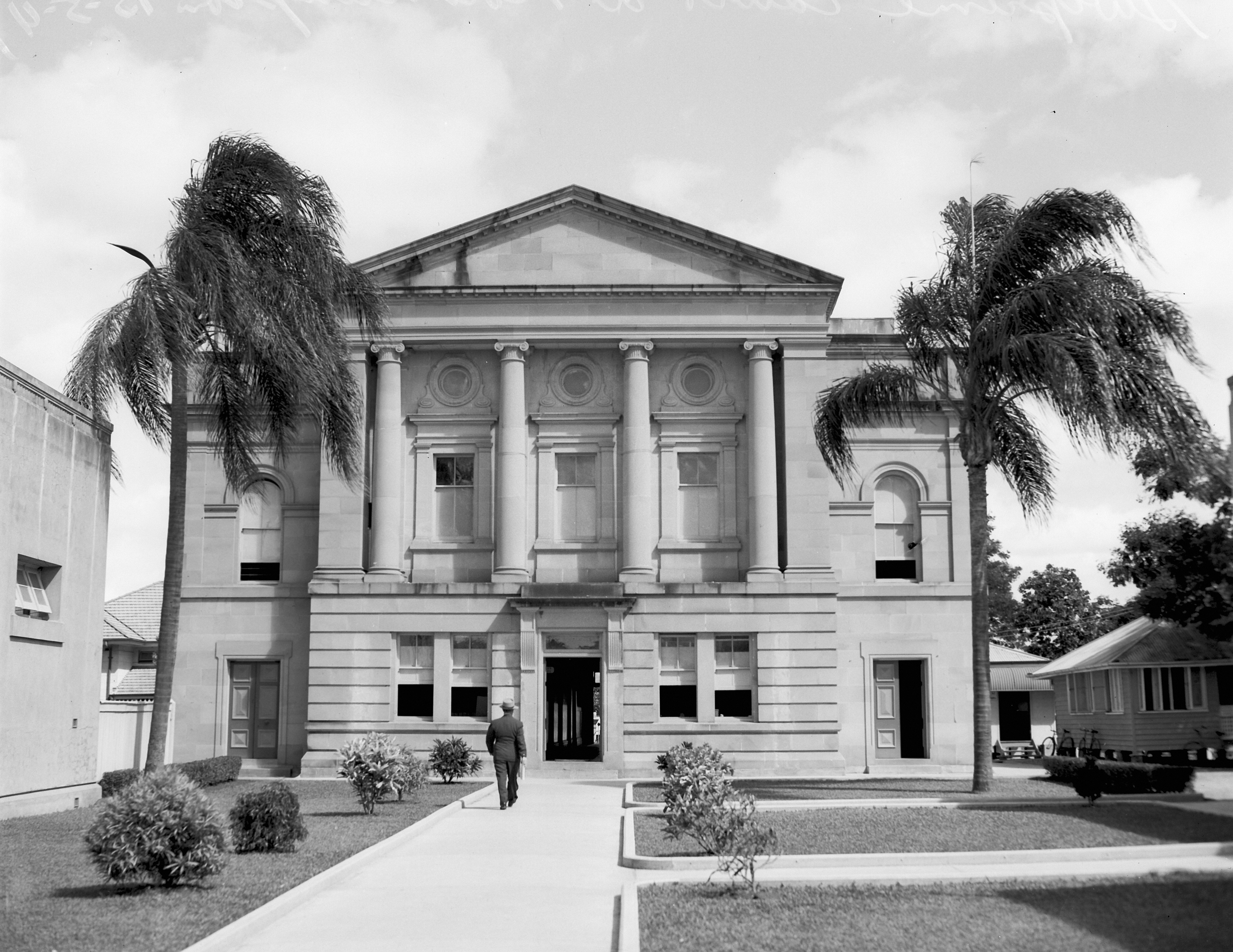
Supreme Court at Rockhampton, 1947

The Supreme Court building is a two-storeyed rendered masonry structure with a sandstone northeastern entrance facade. The building has a T-shaped plan with a corrugated iron gable roof to the front section, containing the main Court room, and a hipped roof to the rear section. The building is located towards the centre of the site, and is surrounded by the Magistrate's Court to the northeast, the District Court to the east, the Family Services' building to the southwest, and the Government Office building to the west. To the north of the building is the site for a proposed new Court facility.

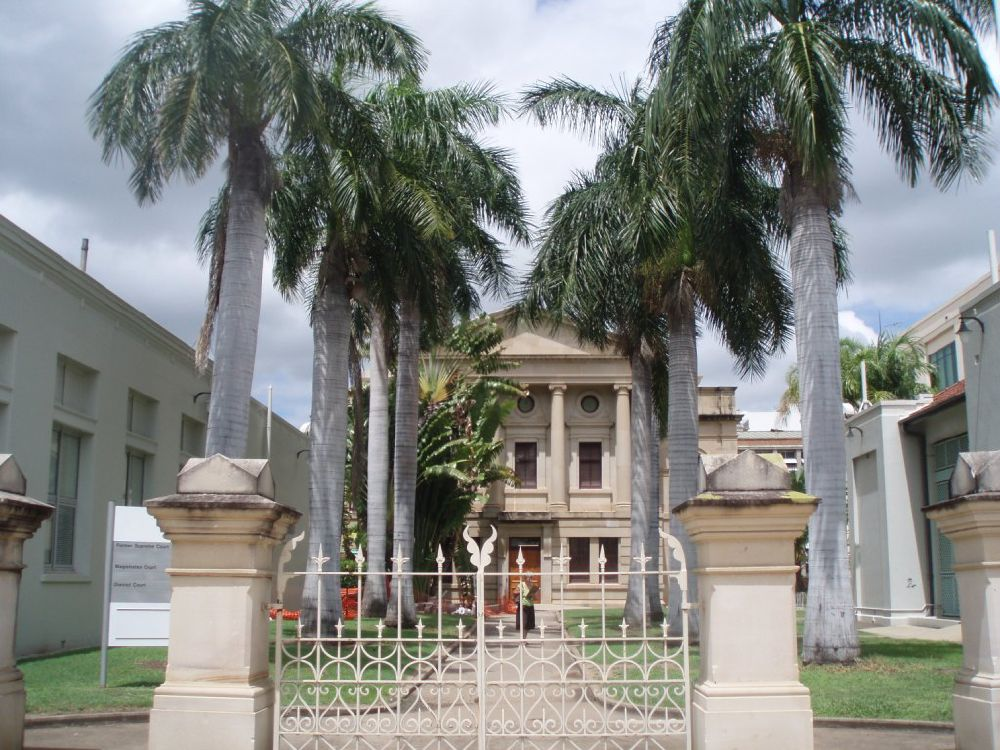
Supreme Court, 2009

The building is approached from the northeast via a wide pathway through an avenue of Royal Palms (Roystonea regia) between the Magistrate's Court and District Court buildings. Gates are located at the East Street entrance, which consist of four large gate posts with wrought iron central gates and an open walkway either side. A curved wrought iron palisade on a sandstone base connects the outermost gate pillars with the adjacent Magistrate's Court and District Court buildings.

The northeast entrance elevation is faced with ashlar sandstone, and has a central prostyle portico to the first floor, the base of which forms the ground floor entrance. The portico has four Ionic columns, which are flanked by square columns at either side, supporting an entablature and pediment finished with dentils. Three tall sash windows, centred between the columns, are framed with pilasters, pedestal and entablature, and each is surmounted by a circular window framed with relief carving. The ground floor, forming the base to the portico, has banded rustication with a central doorway framed with a sandstone entrance canopy. The entrance is flanked by paired sash windows. The prostyle portico is flanked by lower corner sections which have a centrally located arched sash window to the first floor and a paired timber door to the ground floor. A shallow skillion roof is concealed behind a parapet which surmounts a deep cornice.

The rear section of the front wing, which contains the main Court room, has two-storeyed enclosed arcades on either side. The ground floor has arched openings, and the first floor has taller openings framed with pilasters supporting a deep cornice, infilled with metal framed window units and rendered masonry.

The rear wing, finished in scribed render to imitate ashlar, has sash windows with hoods consisting of cast iron brackets and corrugated iron awnings, and a central recessed two-storeyed verandah on the southwest. The verandah has cast iron columns and brackets, with a timber lattice valance, to the ground floor, and cast iron columns and balustrade, with louvred timber screens above the handrail, to the first floor. French doors open onto the first floor verandah, and the ground floor has panelled timber doors with fanlights, and sash windows. The northwest end of the rear wing has an enclosed ground floor verandah with fibrous cement cladding, casement windows and a curved corrugated iron awning.

Internally, the ground floor contains a central corridor with Supreme Court Registry offices on the northern side, and Civil Court offices on the southern side. A staircase was originally located at either end of the northeast elevation, however only the northern stair is extant. The Supreme Court library is located at the northwest end of the rear wing, and witness rooms, staircase and strong rooms are located at the southwest end. Internal load-bearing walls are rendered masonry, partition walls are lath and plaster, and ceilings are boarded. The building has cedar joinery, including architraves, skirtings, panelled doors with fanlights, and staircases with turned balustrades.

The first floor contains the Supreme Court Room with an enclosed arcade either side. Witness rooms are located at the northeast end, and the jury room, court reporter, barrister's and judge's chambers are located at the southwest end. The court room has tall arched windows opening to the enclosed arcades either side, with expressed extrados and imposts. The side walls have timber panelling to window sill height, and the rear of the court room has a timber panelled wall which extends to form a balustrade to a mezzanine gallery which overlooks the court. The non-original ceiling is constructed of suspended acoustic tiles with a lower bulkhead over the raised judge's bench, which is flanked by an arched vestibule to either side. The court room has cedar joinery, including judge's bench, witness box, jury stand, and press gallery, as well as public barriers, panelled doors with fanlights, architraves and wall panelling. The remaining rooms have similar finishes to the ground floor, and the rear rooms which open onto the verandah have timber fireplace surrounds and French doors.

=== Magistrate's Court ===
The Magistrate's Court, a single-storeyed rendered masonry structure, scribed to imitate ashlar, is located towards the northeast area of the site fronting East Street, and is surrounded by the Supreme Court to the southwest and the District Court to the southeast. The building has a tiled hipped roof to the central section, with parapeted elevations at the front and rear. The hipped roof has a cupola, consisting of a dome supported by a ring of columns on a polygonal base with a central ridge ventilator, and skillion roofed dormer windows projecting to the southeast, northeast and northwest.

The building, designed with Art Deco detailing, has a symmetrical East Street elevation with a recessed central portico surmounted by a high parapet and flanked by lower wings to either side. The portico is framed by a stylised relief entablature with central motif and paired pilasters to either side, with two square columns located centrally. The portico has central paired timber panelled doors flanked by multi- paned windows, which are surmounted by high-level multi-paned glazing. The side wings also have a central multi-paned window surmounted by high level multi-paned glazing, and the parapets are capped by stylised details.

The facade treatment of the side wings returns mid-way along the side elevations, with regularly spaced multi-paned casement windows with high level multi-paned glazing. The rear section of the side wings have recessed enclosed verandahs with stylised square columns. The verandahs have central paired timber panelled doors with stylised rendered architraves, flanked by large multi-paned sash windows and surmounted by high level multi-paned glazing. The northwest elevation has a lattice enclosed skillion roofed extension to the enclosed verandah.

The rear elevation has central paired timber doors, flanked by regularly spaced multi-paned windows surmounted by high level multi- paned glazing. The eaves protrude through the central section of the parapet, which is capped by stylised details and returns along the side elevations to abut the recessed verandahs.

Internally, the building has been recently refitted, and has rendered masonry walls and suspended ceilings. The building contains two court rooms, the first of which fronts the entrance portico and the second, where the original court room was located, is accessed via the enclosed side verandahs. The side wings contain offices and service rooms, and the rear section has interview and service rooms. Much of the original detailing survives, including architraves, skirtings and window sills.

=== District Court ===
The District Court, a single-storeyed rendered masonry structure, is located towards the eastern corner of the site fronting East Street, and is surrounded by the Supreme Court to the west and the Magistrate's Court to the northeast. The building has a tiled hipped roof to the central section, with parapeted elevations at the front and to both sides. The hipped roof has a cupola, consisting of a dome supported by a ring of columns on a polygonal base with a central ridge ventilator.

The building, designed with Art Deco detailing, has a symmetrical East Street elevation similar to the adjacent Magistrate's Court which consists of a recessed central portico surmounted by a high parapet and flanked by lower wings to either side. The portico is framed by a stylised relief entablature with central motif and paired pilasters to either side, with two square columns located centrally. The portico has central, non-original paired aluminium framed glass doors flanked by aluminium framed windows, which are surmounted by high-level glazing. The side wings also have a central aluminium framed window surmounted by high level glazing, and the parapets are capped by stylised details.

The parapet detailing continues along the side elevations which have regularly spaced non-original aluminium framed windows, surmounted by high level glazing units which have been closed over. The rear elevation has a central recessed verandah with skillion awning.

Internally, the building has been altered quite substantially, with partition walls creating a central court room surrounded by offices and meeting rooms, with service rooms at the rear. Surviving sections of original walls are rendered masonry, and ceilings are suspended. The entrance foyer has some surviving expressed mouldings including pilasters and cornices.

=== Family Services' Building ===
The Family Services' building, a single-storeyed rendered masonry structure, scribed to imitate ashlar, is located towards the southern corner of the site fronting Bolsover Street, and is surrounded by the Supreme Court to the northeast and the Government Office building to the northwest. The building has a tiled hipped roof with a parapeted elevation fronting Bolsover Street. The roof has a central cupola, consisting of a dome supported by a ring of columns on a polygonal base with a central ridge ventilator.

The building, designed with Art Deco detailing, has a symmetrical Bolsover Street elevation with a recessed central portico surmounted by a high parapet and flanked by lower recessed wings to either side. The portico is framed by a stylised relief entablature, with paired pilasters to either side and two square columns located centrally, and flanked by a tall multi-paned sash window with expressed architraves and sill to either side. The portico has three sets of paired timber panelled doors with glass inserts surmounted by high-level glazing with expressed architrave details. The side wings each have a separate recessed entrance, with the northwest entrance forming the principal entrance to the building with a disabled access ramp.

The side elevations have regularly spaced, tall multi-paned sash windows with expressed architraves and sills. The rear elevation has a central recessed verandah with tiled skillion awning flanked by projecting side wings. The side wings have two tall multi-paned sash windows with expressed architraves and sills, the verandah is enclosed with aluminium framed glazing, and high level glazing is located above the awning.

Internally, the building has been altered quite substantially, with partition walls forming a series of offices, a security reception area, and store rooms. Original walls are rendered masonry, and most ceilings are suspended. An original section of panelled ceiling is located in the toilets in the rear of the building. Original details include architraves, skirtings and some timber panelled doors.

=== Government Office Building ===
The Government Office building is located towards the western corner of the site fronting Bolsover and Fitzroy Streets, and is surrounded by the Supreme Court to the east and the Family Services' building to the southeast. The building has an L-shaped plan, with a three- storeyed wing fronting Bolsover Street, and a four-storeyed corner section fronting Fitzroy Street.

The building has a reinforced concrete frame with brick facing. The Bolsover Street elevation has a curtain wall of metal framed glazing, with polished granite spandrel panels with sandstone sills to the ground floor, which is divided by regularly spaced vertical concrete aggregate fins and which is framed by brickwork. The southern end of the Bolsover Street elevation has brickwork to the upper two floors surmounting the principal entrance, which comprises a recessed metal framed glass door with cantilevered awning accessed via an L-shaped granite stair and landing with metal balustrade. The southern end also has a narrow penthouse plantroom which is recessed from the exterior of the building, with rendered walls, and a curved roof facing Bolsover Street with a series of recessed circular details. The northern end of the elevation has a four-storeyed brickwork facade with three windows to each of the first three floors. The fourth floor partly extends above the curtain wall glazing, with a large recessed window unit and spandrel panel. A low parapet wall with sculptural copper spitters conceals a shallow pitched roof with sculptural copper ridge ventilators.

The rear of the building, facing the northeast, is treated in a similar architectural manner to the Bolsover Street elevation. The southeast elevation has a brickwork facade with three recessed panels to each floor containing metal framed glazing with spandrel panels, with the ground floor having a concrete surround with sandstone faced vertical dividing panels. A recessed vertical glazing strip is located adjacent to the recessed panels, and contains metal framed glazing and spandrel panels lighting an internal staircase. An entrance is located at the ground level, with a concrete awning with copper spitter, and a cantilevered balcony with a flag pole, surmounted by a lightning conductor, and metal balustrading is located above and opens off the penthouse plantroom. The penthouse plantroom has glazing to the southeast.

The northwest elevation, fronting Fitzroy Street, has a brickwork facade with regularly spaced window units to the first three floors. The fourth floor has a long recessed panel containing metal framed glazing and spandrel panels. A recessed three-storeyed section, located on the northeast side of this elevation, has metal framed glazing and spandrel panels lighting an internal staircase. This section was intended to form the linkage to a proposed wing facing Fitzroy Street which was not constructed, and its end facade has reinforced concrete framing and brick infill. The roof of the corner section has a metal balustrade and houses a large satellite dish and plant.

The building has a raised plinth, with raised brick gardens with sandstone cappings located to both the Bolsover and Fitzroy Street elevations.

Internally, the building has an entrance foyer with terrazzo floor at the southeast. The foyer has planter boxes to the southeast windows with polished granite facings and cappings, and marble cladding to the window reveals. The foyer is split-level, with steps leading to a raised lift foyer, with a central lift around which a terrazzo stair is located. The lift core has circular openings with metal grilles, giving a port-hole effect, and each floor has a terrazzo finished lift foyer. The penthouse plantroom is accessed via a narrow timber stair from the lift foyer below. The Bolsover Street wing is planned to have a central corridor, which is delineated by a row of columns to either side, with partitions dividing the office space. The central corridor has a lower ceiling housing a ventilation system with registers to the adjacent office space. Sections of the original partitioning system survive, with tracks for the location of partitions evident in the ceilings and walls. Toilets, stores and service rooms are located at the northwest end of the building, and have terrazzo floors and ceramic tiled walls. A second terrazzo dog-leg stair is located fronting Fitzroy Street at the northern corner of the building, with an entrance foyer with terrazzo floor. This stair has a sculptural balustrade consisting of tapered metal vertical members, shaped timber handrail, and solid vertical panels.

=== Grounds ===
The grounds contain a toilet block to the southeast of the Supreme Court. This structure has rendered masonry walls to door head height, with timber slats above to the underside of the corrugated iron hipped roof with central clerestory. The toilets have a central pedimented porch, which has been infilled with rendered masonry and glass louvres. The toilets are entered from either side by a timber door with upper lattice panel. Internally, the structure has a boarded timber ceiling, and timber framed partitions with timber doors which have upper glass panels.

== Heritage listing ==
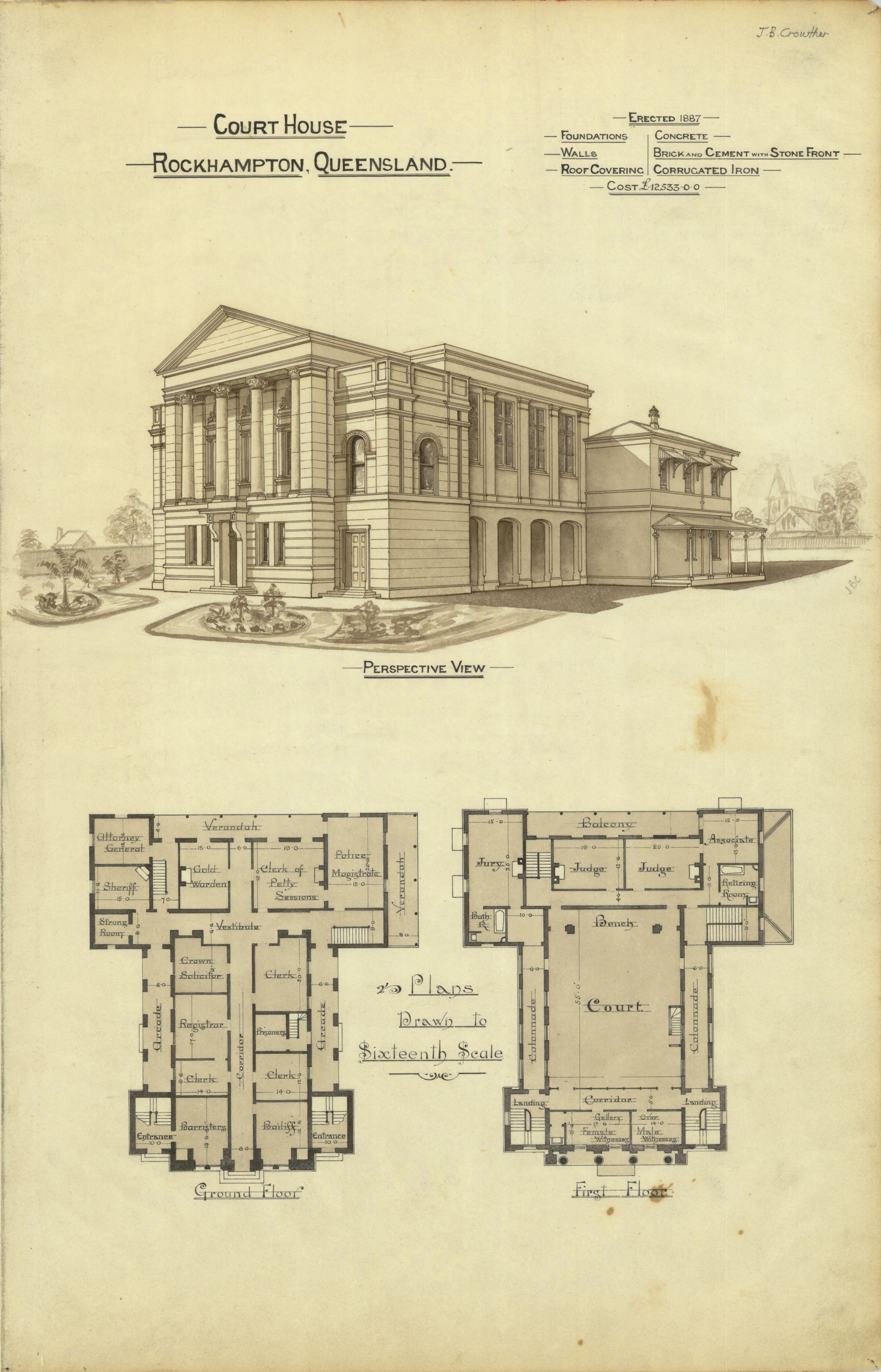
Architectural plans for the courthouse, circa 1888

Rockhampton Courthouse complex was listed on the Queensland Heritage Register on 21 October 1992 having satisfied the following criteria.

The place is important in demonstrating the evolution or pattern of Queensland's history.

It is significant for demonstrating the development of Rockhampton and the Government Reserve since 1861, and the provision of state government services in the City of Rockhampton and the region of central Queensland.

The Supreme Court building is important in demonstrating the evolution of the judicial system in Queensland through the growth of the Circuit Court, for its association with the establishment of the Supreme Court in Queensland.

The building is also a visible expression of the wealth generated by the economic boom during the 1880s as a result of the discovery of gold at Mount Morgan.

The Magistrate's Court, District Court, and Family Services' buildings reflect the involvement of the Queensland Government in the development of Rockhampton, from 1915 until the present day, in various areas such as the administration of justice, and the provision of government services within Rockhampton.

The buildings are significant for demonstrating the involvement of the Queensland Government, in the period of 1915–1936, in providing court and administrative services to the Rockhampton community, and in the intervention of the economy through the provision of Government financial institutions. The Magistrate's Court and Family Services' building are associated with a construction programme, undertaken by the Queensland Government during the depression era, designed to generate work to alleviate unemployment.

The Government Office building is significant in demonstrating the post-war development of Rockhampton, particularly through the provision of governmental services and the introduction of multi-storeyed office accommodation.

The place demonstrates rare, uncommon or endangered aspects of Queensland's cultural heritage.

The Supreme Court building is important as the only surviving nineteenth-century Court House that has served the Supreme Court continuously since 1896.

The place is important in demonstrating the principal characteristics of a particular class of cultural places.

The complex is also an important example of urban design, comprising a series of buildings dating from the 1880s to the 1950s which have been designed in a coordinated manner intended to enhance the civic centre of Rockhampton.

The building is one of only three surviving courthouses designed by him in Queensland, and is important in demonstrating the planning of a nineteenth-century Supreme Court house.

The place is important because of its aesthetic significance.

The Supreme Court building is of considerable architectural merit, and the form and fabric of the building illustrate a skilled design approach. The building, together with the surrounding structures, makes a significant aesthetic contribution to the local streetscape and Rockhampton townscape. The building is an important component of the civic centre of Rockhampton, and demonstrates the grand vision that the community held for Rockhampton as a future northern Capital during the late nineteenth century.

The buildings and grounds have considerable aesthetic significance which, designed as pavilion structures surrounding the Supreme Court building, demonstrate a coordinated design approach intended to enhance the civic centre of Rockhampton. The buildings, together with the Supreme Court, make a significant aesthetic contribution to the local streetscape and Rockhampton townscape, and are an important component of the civic centre of Rockhampton.

The structure's form, fabric and materials illustrate a skilled design approach, and the building makes an important aesthetic contribution to the local streetscape and Rockhampton townscape. The building is an important component of the civic centre of Rockhampton.

The place has a strong or special association with a particular community or cultural group for social, cultural or spiritual reasons.

The complex has a special association with the Rockhampton community, containing some of the city's principal public buildings.

The place has a special association with the life or work of a particular person, group or organisation of importance in Queensland's history.

The Supreme Court building is significant as an example of the work of eminent architect John James Clark, Colonial Architect from 1883 to 1885.

The Supreme Court building is also significant for its association with the shearer's strike conspiracy trial of 1891, and the Labor Party that was to subsequently evolve as a result of the trial.

The Government Office building is significant as an example of the work of John Hitch, a post-war immigrant architect employed by the Department of Public Works, who made an important contribution to the post-war development of architecture in Queensland. The building is of considerable architectural significance, and when constructed was much admired by the architectural student community, providing a local example of the architectural aesthetic promoted by leading journals. The building was one of the first substantial public buildings built by the department after the Second World War, and demonstrated a radical change in design philosophy.
