= Commonwealth Bank Building, Mount Morgan =

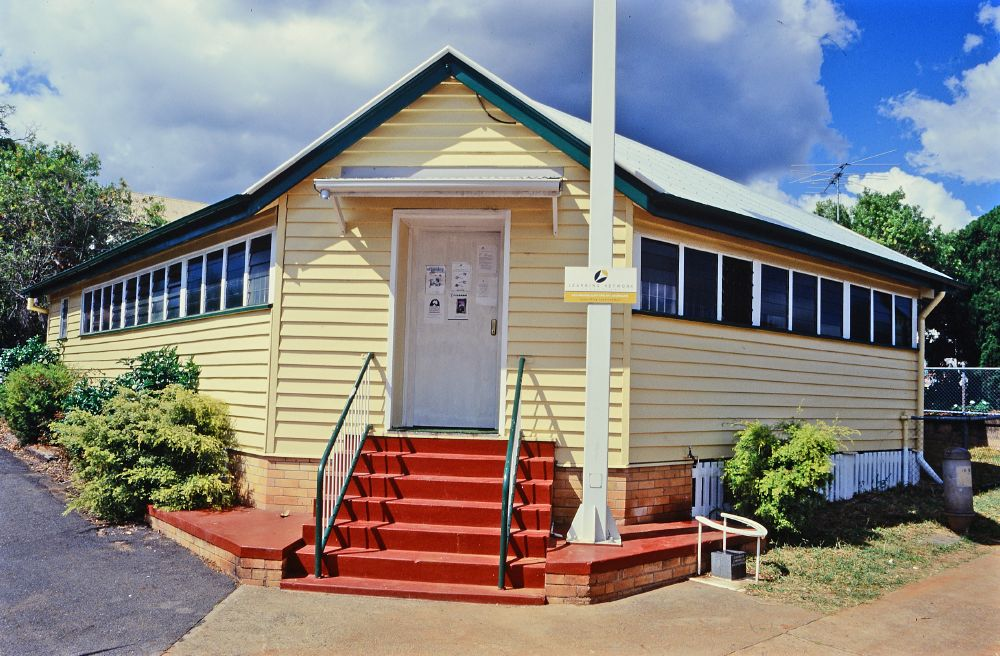
- Former Commonwealth Bank, 2001

- Location within Queensland Location within Australia
- 23.6457°S 150.3876°E
- Location: 38 Morgan Street, Mount Morgan, Rockhampton Region, Queensland, Australia

History
- Design period: 1900–1914 (early 20th century)
- Built: c. 1913

Queensland Heritage Register
- Official name: Commonwealth Bank (former), Queensland Savings Bank
- Type: state heritage (built)
- Designated: 21 October 1992
- Reference no.: 600746
- Significant period: 1910s (fabric); 1913–1998 (historical use)
- Significant components: strong room

Commonwealth Bank Building is a heritage-listed bank at 38 Morgan Street, Mount Morgan, Rockhampton Region, Queensland, Australia. It was built c. 1913. It is also known as Queensland Savings Bank. It was added to the Queensland Heritage Register on 21 October 1992.

== History ==
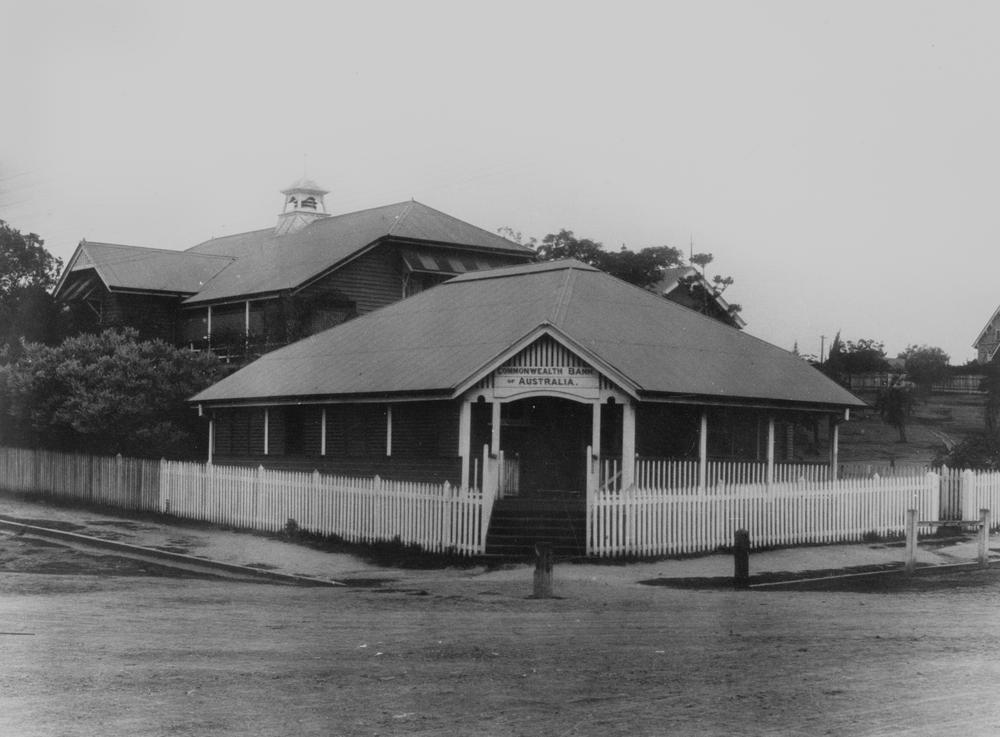
Commonwealth Bank building, Mount Morgan, 1922

The former Commonwealth Bank at Mount Morgan was constructed in 1913 as the Queensland Government Savings Bank, and became a branch of the Commonwealth Bank of Australia in 1921.

The Queensland Government Savings Bank was established by one of the earliest pieces of legislation enacted by the government of the new colony of Queensland in 1861. Intended to encourage small deposit saving by working people, savings banks could be established by the gazettal of an application by ten or more house or landholders in any community of more than 500 people. In 1864, the Government Savings Bank Bill provided a government guarantee to protect trustees and deposits and to allow depositors to easily transfer accounts from one town to another. It was a great success and on 9 May 1887, the Savings Bank opened an agency at the Mount Morgan Post Office.

The township of Mount Morgan grew with the establishment of what was to become the richest gold mine in the world. Although small mining claims occurred before 1882, the three Morgan Brothers pegged claims which encompassed most of the mountain top in that year. In July they formed a partnership with three Rockhampton businessmen before selling out to them 1886 when the Mount Morgan Gold Mining Company Limited was formed. The township quickly developed, establishing an infrastructure for the rapidly increasing population. The Queensland National Bank also opened in Mount Morgan in 1887, although this was a trading, rather than a savings bank, these activities at the time being kept separate.

The Commonwealth Bank of Australia was founded under the Commonwealth Bank Act 1911. This empowered the bank to transact both savings and trading business under the security of a guarantee from the Australian Government. It opened its first branch for business on 15 July 1912 in Melbourne and soon opened agencies in post offices throughout Victoria. The Queensland branch was opened on 16 September 1912. Post offices were used as agencies throughout the country as they had been transferred to Commonwealth control after Federation. The Commonwealth Bank of Australia merged with the state banks of Tasmania in 1912, Queensland in 1920 and Western Australia and New South Wales in 1931.

In 1913 the Queensland Government Savings Bank opened its own branch on the corner of Morgan and Central Streets on an area that was designated a reserve for the purpose. It was a modest timber building with timber dowel balustrades along both streets. The site was adjacent to the Central State School which had constructed its first building nearby in 1887. Subsequent building at the school eventually wrapped around the corner site on which the bank was built.

The business and assets of the Queensland Government Savings Bank were transferred to the Commonwealth Bank on 8 December 1920 and this bank operated from the premises from 3 January 1921. In the 1920s, there were three banks operating in Mount Morgan; the Queensland National Bank, the Bank of New South Wales and the Commonwealth Bank. Following the closure of the Bank of New South Wales in 1928 and the Queensland National Bank in 1929, the Commonwealth remained the only bank in Mount Morgan until 1950 when the ANZ bank opened a branch there. During the Second World War the Commonwealth Bank, it branches and agencies, acted as an agent for the government. As part of the growth in Australia following the war, home loans were offered from 1946.

By the late 1970s the original verandahs of the bank were enclosed and the exterior walls on these sides were removed to enlarge the interior space available. A set of concrete steps was added around 1980.

In 1990 the Mount Morgan mine closed, leading to a reduction of population and business in the town. The Commonwealth Bank ceased trading from this site in 1998. The building is currently being used as the offices of Learning Network Queensland.

== Description ==
The former Commonwealth Bank building is situated on the corner of Morgan and Central Streets, Mount Morgan, in the north east corner of the Central State School site. It is a single storey, timber-framed structure, clad with horizontal weatherboards and set on low stumps. The building has a rectangular plan, truncated at the corner facing the intersection of the two streets to allow for a principal corner entrance. This is below an entrance gable and is accessed by concrete steps and shaded by a small cantilevered awning. The vented hipped roof is clad with corrugated iron sheeting which extends over the former verandahs. To the south is a skillion roof extension which houses the strong room and offices. There is also a fibrous cement clad extension on the south east corner which accommodates toilets. Banks of glass louvres under the eaves line the north and west sides of the building, which address the streets. The eastern side has a pair of sash windows shaded by a single sunhood.

The interior is now largely open plan, although a change in ceiling height demonstrates the position of former verandahs. The walls and ceiling are lined with tongue and groove boards. To the south are offices and a strong room with a heavy metal door inserted into a brick section between the timber office and toilets extension.

== Heritage listing ==
The former Commonwealth Bank building was listed on the Queensland Heritage Register on 21 October 1992 having satisfied the following criteria.

The place is important in demonstrating the evolution or pattern of Queensland's history.

The former Commonwealth Bank as a branch of the Queensland Government Savings Bank demonstrates the regional development of the state and its presence is suggestive of the large number of workers present in the town because of the Mount Morgan Mine.

The place is important in demonstrating the principal characteristics of a particular class of cultural places.

The building is characteristic of small timber banks in regional towns, modest in scale and finish, but occupying a prominent corner site.

The place is important because of its aesthetic significance.

The former bank building has aesthetic value for its contribution to the Central State School site, a large complex of timber buildings similar in form, scale and material to which the former bank building, sited prominently at the street intersection, forms a centrepiece.

The place has a strong or special association with a particular community or cultural group for social, cultural or spiritual reasons.

As Mount Morgan's only bank for 21 years and one which served the community for the best part of the 20th century, and as the premises of the institution which acted as an agent of the Commonwealth during the war, the former bank building has an important connection with the Mount Morgan community.
