= Gympie Lands Office =

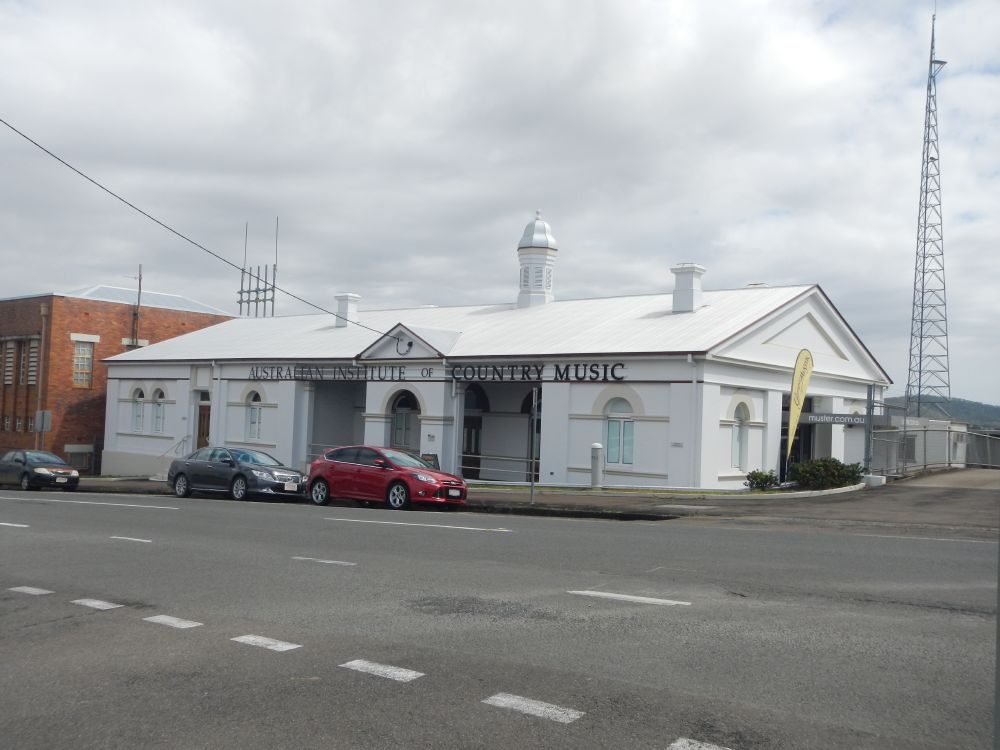
- Australian Institute of Country Music (formerly the Gympie Lands Office), 2016

- Location within Queensland Location within Australia
- 26.1878°S 152.6587°E
- Location: 26 Channon Street, Gympie, Queensland, Australia

History
- Design period: 1939–1945 (World War II)
- Built: 1942

Site notes
- Architect(s): Department of Public Works (Queensland), Colonial Architect's Office
- Architectural style: Classicism

Queensland Heritage Register
- Official name: Gympie Court House and Lands Office (former)
- Type: state heritage (built)
- Designated: 15 July 2011
- Reference no.: 602778
- Significant period: 1876–1901, 1942
- Significant components: toilet block/earth closet/water closet, strong room, air raid shelter, court house
- Builders: Department of Public Works, Gympie City Council, Mark Doggett, Andrew Collins, George Caldwell

Gympie Lands Office is a heritage-listed former court house and public administration building at 26 Channon Street, Gympie, Queensland, Australia. It was designed by Queensland Department of Public Works and Queensland Colonial Architect's Office and built in 1942 by the Department of Public Works, Gympie City Council, Mark Doggett, Andrew Collins, and George Caldwell. It was added to the Queensland Heritage Register on 15 July 2011.

== History ==
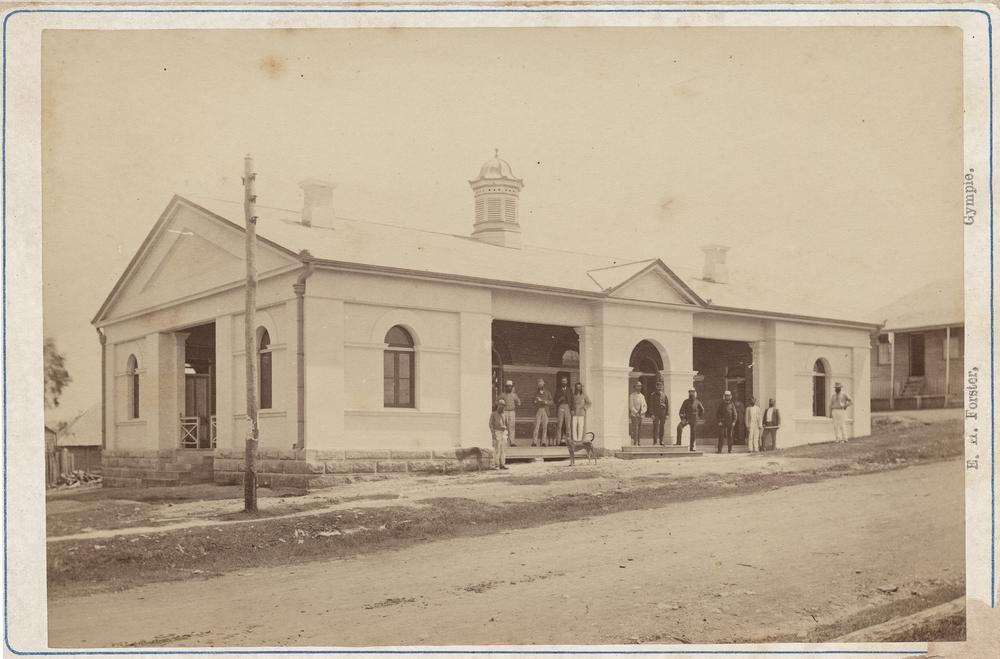
Men standing outside the courthouse in Gympie, 1870

The second Gympie Court House was built during 1875 and 1876 in Channon Street. The classical revival style brick and stone building was designed by the Colonial Architect's Office, and was extended in 1893 to include the Gympie Lands Office. It was the first substantial public building constructed in the town which developed at the site of Queensland's first major productive goldfield. The only known surviving earlier Queensland court houses (purpose-built) are in Ipswich (stone and brick, 1859, Old Ipswich Courthouse) and Toowoomba (its first, brick, 1863, Old Toowoomba Court House). Other known surviving 1870s court houses in Queensland include those in: Maryborough (brick, 1877, Maryborough Courthouse), Port Douglas (timber, 1879, Port Douglas Court House Museum), St Lawrence (timber, 1878, St Lawrence Police Station), Toowoomba (its second, sandstone, 1878, Toowoomba Court House) and Townsville (brick, 1877, Townsville Magistrates Court). Also present on the site, behind the main building, are an 1882 strongroom and a 1942 air raid shelter.

Gympie (initially called Nashville) was established after the discovery of gold in October 1867 by James Nash. Although small finds of gold had been made in the region-near Imbil, Black Snake Range, and Nanango, it was the discovery of gold at Gympie in a gully near the Mary River that suddenly changed the fortunes of the region and Queensland. The new gold field established Queensland as a significant gold producer, contributing much needed finances to the young colony. By Christmas of 1867, according to the Gold Commissioner, the Gympie field had a population of 4,000 (or over 15,000 according to James Nash). Although the alluvial deposits were quickly exhausted, from 1868 shallow reef mining occurred. From 1875 a third phase of mining began, based on deep reef mining, which marked a new era of wealth and prosperity for Gympie. Peak gold production occurred in 1903 but by 1927 production at Gympie had almost ceased.

As it evolved from a hastily established mining settlement, Gympie developed a distinctive character with an irregular street pattern amid a series of valleys and ridges. Existing buildings and mining homestead leases were accommodated in the first survey of the township in April 1868. Development of roads within the township of Gympie followed the terrain rather than adopting the standard grid pattern that was applied to townships surveyed for settlement, and consequently many roads run along ridgelines with linking roads across valleys and hillsides. The early makeshift structures of 1860s Gympie gradually gave way to more permanent and substantial public and private buildings, including government buildings on Channon Street from the mid 1870s.

The first government buildings in Gympie – the Gold Commissioner's Office, Powder Magazine and Post Office – were built in 1868. The Gympie Gold Commissioner, Henry Edward King, (also Secretary for Public Works and Mines from November 1874 to May 1876) initially conducted his court in temporary structures, and the first permanent mining court was a slab and shingle-roofed building near Cross Street, northwest of the Surface Hill Uniting Church. A Court of Petty Sessions, Commissioner's Camp, Mary River Gold Fields, was proclaimed by the Governor in Council on 20 February 1868, and by 1869 there was a court house at the corner of Duke and Channon Streets, on Commissioner's Hill (on the site of the town's third Post Office). The town's second Post Office was located just northwest of this court house. The 1876 court house (the second Court of Petty Sessions in Gympie) was built on the site of the original police lock-up and stables, on the north side of Channon Street between Duke and King Streets.

Planning for this new court house began in 1874. In December of that year EH Harries, a draughtsman with the Colonial Architect's Office, reported that a new Gympie court house of brick with stone foundations, with a court room 40 by 24 feet (12.2 by 7.3 m) and offices for the Police Magistrate and Clerk of Petty Sessions, would cost around £1,500. Tenders were called on 23 December 1874 and the £1,468 tender of Andrew Collins, a builder from Red Hill, Gympie, was accepted in a Memorandum of Agreement with the Secretary of Public Works (HE King) on 13 March 1875.

The designer of the Gympie Court House is unknown. It is not attributed to FDG Stanley (Colonial Architect 1873 to 1881), although it has some stylistic touches in common with his work on the Maryborough Court House (1875–1878) and the third Gympie Post Office (1878–1880). However, it is possible that the Gympie Court House was designed either by EH Harries or by George Connolly. Connolly joined the Colonial Architect's Office in 1872. Much of his work is derivative of FDG Stanley or John James Clark (Colonial Architect 1883–1885), and his best known designs include the classical revival style Northern Supreme Court at Bowen (1880–1881). The classical revival style was thought to be well suited to those public buildings intended to convey a sense of stability and dignity.

The new court house was finished in April 1876. The Brisbane Courier's Gympie correspondent reported that to celebrate a grand calico ball would be held there on 19 April. The building was described as a substantial, commodious brick edifice which appeared to be fitted up with every convenience suitable to the purpose for which it was designed.

However, this was not the case and inadequacies were reported. By June 1876 the building was occupied, but due to a lack of fittings the Police Magistrate had to convey his documents to the old court house. On 1 July 1876 the Brisbane Courier's Gympie correspondent commented on the bad acoustics of the alcove behind the bench, stating that "sounds as if a multitude of voices were speaking at the one time were heard all over the building, and caused much confusion ...directly a word is uttered, it is immediately sucked into the alcove, and smashed into fragments against the walls, the pieces being hurled back at the speaker".

Furniture was still a problem in 1881, when a letter of complaint from residents of Gympie noted that there was no provision for seating the public, jurors, suitors or witnesses, and jurors had to use the office of the Clerk of Petty Sessions to confer. A jury room was built on the rear verandah later in 1881. Expenditure on the Gympie court house, as reported by the Department of Public Works in 1891, included: £1,017 in 1875; £674 in 1876; £86 in 1877; £37 in 1881; and £220 (for a strongroom by George Caldwell) in 1882. The strongroom measured 12 by 10 feet (3.7 by 3.0 m) internally, with 18-inch (460 mm) walls, and it is still extant behind the former court house.

In 1888, the layout of the court house included two offices at the southwest end of the building, the corner office on Channon Street being for the Police Magistrate, and the rear corner office was for Clerk of Petty Sessions. There was an area for the judge's bench between the two offices, and the three spaces each had a door leading to a verandah on the southwest elevation. The separate court and public areas took up the main rectangular space of the building. There were also two offices at the corners of the northeast elevation of the building, with a verandah between them. A portico with pediment stood in the centre of the verandah to the Channon street elevation, and the jury room took up the southwest end of the rear verandah. There were fireplaces with chimneys in each of the four offices, and there was a flèche in the centre of the roof.

In early 1891 a jury "escaped" from the jury room, which was too small and hot for 12 men. Its timber walls were also vulnerable to eavesdropping. Two alternative plans were drawn up in October 1892, to provide a room for the use of jurors and two rooms for the Lands Commissioner. The latter had received notice to quit the offices he used at Gympie's third Post Office. The role of the Lands Department was to open up new land for settlement, and to sell, auction, or lease town, country and suburban land. It was also responsible for occupation licences, rabbit control, weed control and roads in new areas. The first applications for land lodged in the Lands Office in Gympie were in early 1869, and the Lands Office may have operated out of the second Post Office at this time.

Another plan was drawn up in November 1892, signed by Alfred Barton Brady, the Government Architect and Engineer for Bridges. This is the plan that was used, and in March 1893 the tender of Mark Doggett of Fortitude Valley in Brisbane, for £535, was accepted by Horace Tozer, Secretary for Public Works and Gympie solicitor. WT Newman carried out the painting at a cost of £35. The brick extension to the south-west included a second room for the Clerk of Petty Sessions (where the old verandah had been), a new room for the Judge and Police Magistrate at the rear, a hallway to Channon Street, a new office for the Lands Commissioner at the rear corner, and a Lands Office in the south-west corner to Channon Street. Doorways from the original south-west elevation's corner rooms onto the front and rear verandahs were sealed around this time. A small verandah was located at the rear corner of the new south-west elevation, accessed from both the Land Commissioner's office and the Judge's room. The old Police Magistrate's office was the Clerk of Petty Session's office by this time, and it was proposed that the original Clerk's office would become the new jury room. The 1893 extension includes the door and two windows at the south-west end of the Channon Street elevation of the current building.

As a result of pressure for a new court house during the mid 1890s a site on the corner of King and Channon Streets, northeast of the 1876 court house, was purchased in 1899. A new court house was built between 1900 and 1902 for a total of £5 671. Consequently, the 1876 court house became the Lands Office, and £27 for alterations to the Lands Office is noted in the Return of Expenditure on State Public Buildings for the period 1 July 1901 to 30 June 1902.

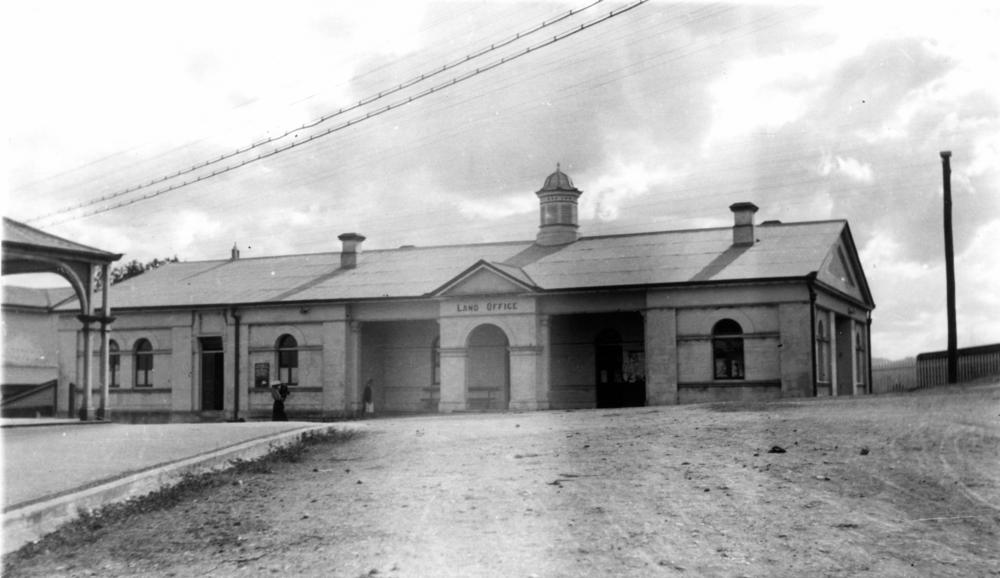
Gympie Lands Office, ca. 1911

During its time as the Lands Office the former court house housed a number of government organisations, which jostled each other for office space and moved around the various offices in the building. The Geological Survey used the main room in the 1893 extension prior to 1912, and cooking classes were held by the Technical College in two rear rooms of the southwest end of the building up to 1917. The Queensland Government Savings Bank (which merged with the Commonwealth Bank in December 1920) occupied various rooms in the southwest end of the building between 1912 and 1927, competing for space with the Forestry Department, which was present in the building from c.1912 to 1921, and again from 1926. Other tenants over time included the Labour Department (prior to 1919 and again from 1927), the Queensland Department of Agriculture and Stock, the Inspector of Machinery, the Inspector of Factories and Shops, and the Agricultural Bank Inspector.

In 1919 the occupants of the north-east end of building included: the Lands Office at the northeast end of the old courtroom; the Land Commissioner in the Channon Street corner office; Land Rangers on the enclosed north-east verandah; and the Inspector of Machinery in the rear corner office. There was still a room on the rear verandah. In the south-west end of the building, the Inspector of Factories and Shops occupied the original Channon Street corner office; the Labour Agent occupied the centre office of the 1893 extension; the Forestry Branch used the old rear corner office and the 1893 extension's rear office; and the Queensland Government Savings Bank occupied the room built for the Lands Office in 1893.

During World War II a concrete air raid shelter for 50 persons was built behind the former court house. Constructed by June 1942 by the Department of Public Works, with help from the Gympie City Council, it was intended to shelter civil service personnel and any members of the public who might be nearby during a Japanese air raid.

By 1949 the timber store room on the back verandah had been demolished, and in 1950 the air raid shelter was modified for storage use by the Lands Office and the Forestry Office. An internal dividing wall (since removed) and casement windows were added. The flèche on the roof of the former court house was removed about 1951, as it had rotted and was leaking water onto the counter used by the Department of Agriculture and Stock. A new kitchen extension was added to the northwest elevation of the court house some time after 1954.

In 2002 the Lands Office building was transferred from the Queensland Government to the Cooloola Shire Council, which made the building available to the Australian Institute of Country Music (AICM). The Apex Club funded the reconstruction of the Lands Office for the AICM, and this work occurred during 2008. As a result, the courtroom became one open space again, and walls were reinstated between the two square rooms towards the southern end of the northwest elevation, and between the vestibule of the 1890s extension and the large room at the southwest end (now a music studio). The doorway between the remnant of the original rear verandah and the original western corner room has been reopened, and a small bathroom (c.1921) off the verandah at the rear corner of the southwest elevation has been converted into an electronic hub room.

== Description ==
The site accommodates a number of buildings and structures. This description is concerned with the former court house (and extensions), strongroom and air raid shelter. A modern brick toilet block located behind the court house is not of cultural heritage significance.

=== Former court house (and extensions) ===
The former court house is a single storey, rectangular, rendered brick building in a classical idiom; the former court house stands prominently to Channon Street, Gympie.

On a site sloping down to the south-west, the building is sheltered by a gable roof clad with trimdeck metal sheeting and stands level with the street at the portico/verandah entrance and is elevated above street level at the southern entrance which is approached by concrete steps. Four rendered masonry chimneys project through the roof.

Defined vertically by plain pilasters, the elevations are unified by employing semi-circular arched openings, decorative moulded sill strips and projecting window head cornices.

The asymmetrical front elevation to Channon Street reflects the 1893 extension to the southwest. The former court house comprises a central pedimented portico flanked by open verandah bays which terminate in the end wings. The bays of the verandah are defined by engaged columns and have horizontal metal tube rails. The wings are each distinguished by a central arched window housing a pair of casement windows and fanlight. The extension to the south-west accommodates an entrance distinguished by a decorative moulded blank fanlight above a double timber door with a flat arch glazed fanlight. The adjacent bay is punctuated by two arched openings housing pairs of casement windows and glazed fanlights.

The north-east elevation comprises an enclosed entrance porch flanked by the northern and eastern corner room wings with the whole crowned by a blank pediment. A modern steel awning (not of cultural heritage significance) extends from the entrance porch. The north-west elevation is dominated by the skillion roofed, brick kitchen extension notable for its banks of hopper windows to three sides. The balance of the elevation comprises the north wing, west wing and the extension to the south-west, punctuated by arched openings housing paired casement windows and fanlights sheltered by timber framed hoods. The blank south-west elevation accommodates two arched openings with paired casement windows and fanlights.

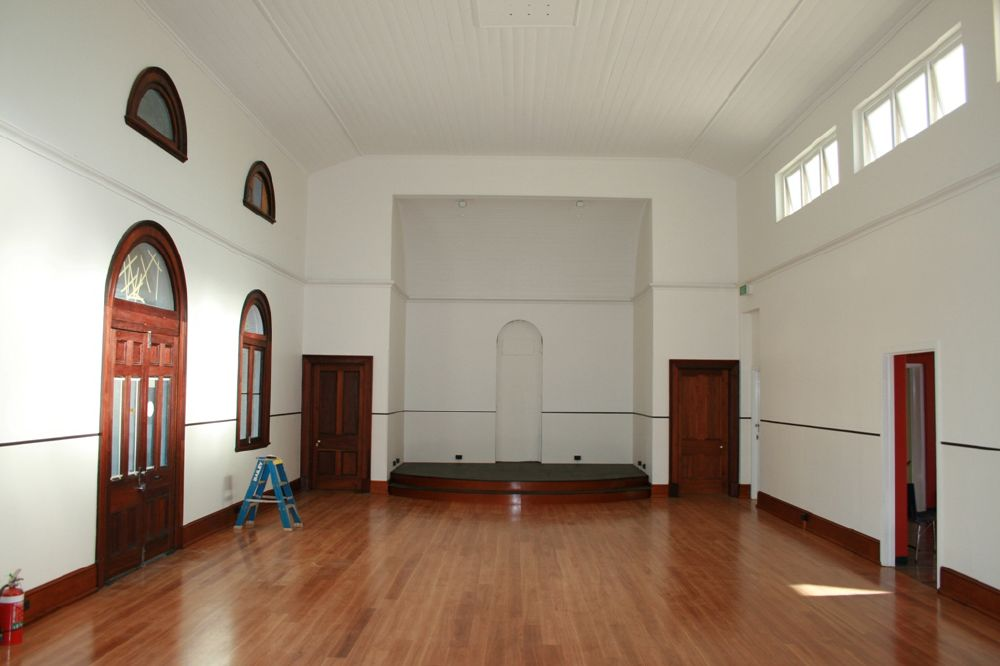
Former courtroom from north-east, 2009

The former court house area of the building is organised around a central rectangular room with square rooms offset to each corner. A verandah runs along the south-east and a later kitchen extension is to the north-west. The original western and southern corner rooms open into the central room, the northern and eastern corner rooms open to the verandah and enclosed porch which in turn opens into the central room. The central room, lit by clerestorey semi-circular lights to the south-east and rectangular hopper windows to the northwest, is notable for its coved ceiling and a vaulted timber lined alcove to the southwest end. Three arched openings to the verandah accommodate two sets of French windows and a set of paired casements, all with fanlights. Each of the corner rooms accommodates a carved timber fireplace. Throughout the building interior walls are plastered; ceilings are lined with tongue and groove timber boards; and floors are polished timber or carpeted. Original joinery (including fine panelled doors and fanlights, skirtings and architraves) is cedar and floors are of pine. Recent joinery around the building is of Malaysian cedar and floors of blackbean.

The southwest extension works off a vestibule which provides access to a large rectangular room to the southwest, the original western and southern corner rooms of the court house and terminates at a square room to the rear of the lands office extension. Evidence remains of the earlier south-west court house entrance porch configuration including the infilled arched doorway into the courtroom.

The kitchen, a light and airy rectangular room lit by banks of hopper windows, projects between the original northern and western corner rooms. The roof is framed with steel web trusses, the ceiling lined with fibre cement sheeting and the kitchen fit-out is modern.

=== Strongroom ===
The strongroom is a freestanding painted brick building to the north-west of the former court house. Measuring 12 by 10 feet (3.7 m × 3.0 m) internally with 18-inch (460 mm) thick walls, the building stands on a concrete slab and is sheltered by a gable roof clad with corrugated metal sheeting. A heavy metal entrance door opens into a depressed arch vaulted ceiling space and lit by a narrow rectangular louvered window to the northwest.

=== Air raid shelter ===
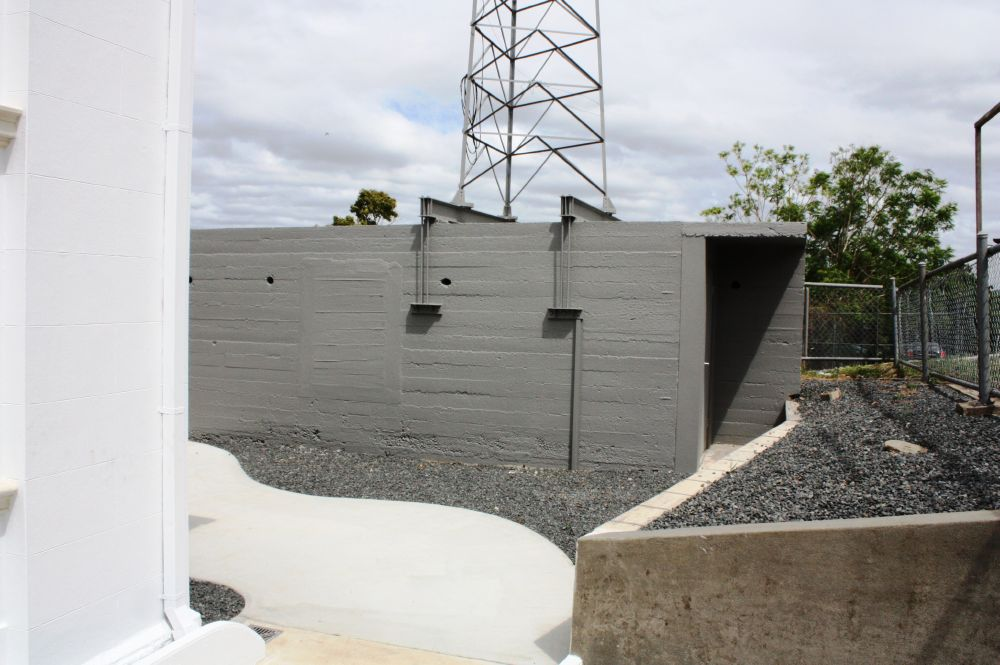
Air raid shelter from the south, 2011

Butting against the north-east side of the strongroom, the rectangular pill box air raid shelter has off-form concrete blast walls, a concrete slab floor and flat roof. It has entrances at the north-east and south-west ends, each with an open porch sheltered by the cantilevered roof. Only the north-east end retains its interior concrete blast wall, which forms an entrance corridor into the main space of the shelter. The floor and ceiling are coved and there are three openings to the north-west and south-east sides housing pairs of eight-light casement windows. Original toilet cubicles remain at each end of the building. The exterior and parts of the interior are painted. A metal framed communications mast sits on the roof of the shelter, but this is not of cultural heritage significance.

== Heritage listing ==
The former Gympie Lands Office was listed on the Queensland Heritage Register on 15 July 2011 having satisfied the following criteria.

The place is important in demonstrating the evolution or pattern of Queensland's history.

The construction of the Gympie Court House in 1876 is important in demonstrating the evolution of Gympie, the site of Queensland's first major productive goldfield, from a shanty town into a permanent settlement. The alluvial gold deposits discovered in 1867 had been exhausted by the 1870s, and shallow reef mining had begun.

The former Gympie Court House is the first substantial masonry public building erected in Gympie and is one of the oldest extant buildings in the city. The place is also the third-oldest known surviving court house building in Queensland. It replaced an adjacent timber court house, and represented the growing town's need for impressive justice buildings to project an image of stability.

The World War II air raid shelter, constructed behind the main building in mid 1942, demonstrates the Queensland government's response to the threat of Japanese air raids, and its policy of building shelters for civil servants so that government could continue to function after an air attack.

The place demonstrates rare, uncommon or endangered aspects of Queensland's cultural heritage.

Important for its association with the Air Raid Precaution (ARP) activities undertaken for the protection of the civil service, the air raid shelter is a rare surviving example of a shelter associated with a public building and is an uncommon surviving example of an ARP structure built during World War II.

The place is important in demonstrating the principal characteristics of a particular class of cultural places.

Standing within a precinct of government buildings near the corner of Duke and Channon Streets on Commissioner's Hill, and retaining major design elements of a court house (central courtroom, associated offices and separated entrances), the former Gympie Court House is important in demonstrating the layout and siting of a 19th-century court house. It was extended to include a Lands Office in 1893, and ceased to function as a court house c. 1901.

A single room structure with thick, solid brick walls and a heavy metal door, the strongroom behind the main building is a good example of a secure storage vault.

Retaining its context and the major design elements of an air raid shelter (rectangular in plan, reinforced concrete roof and external and internal blast walls, two entrances to the same side and toilet cubicles), the air raid shelter is important in demonstrating the layout, operation and siting of structures in the ARP system.
