= Queensland Government Savings Bank =

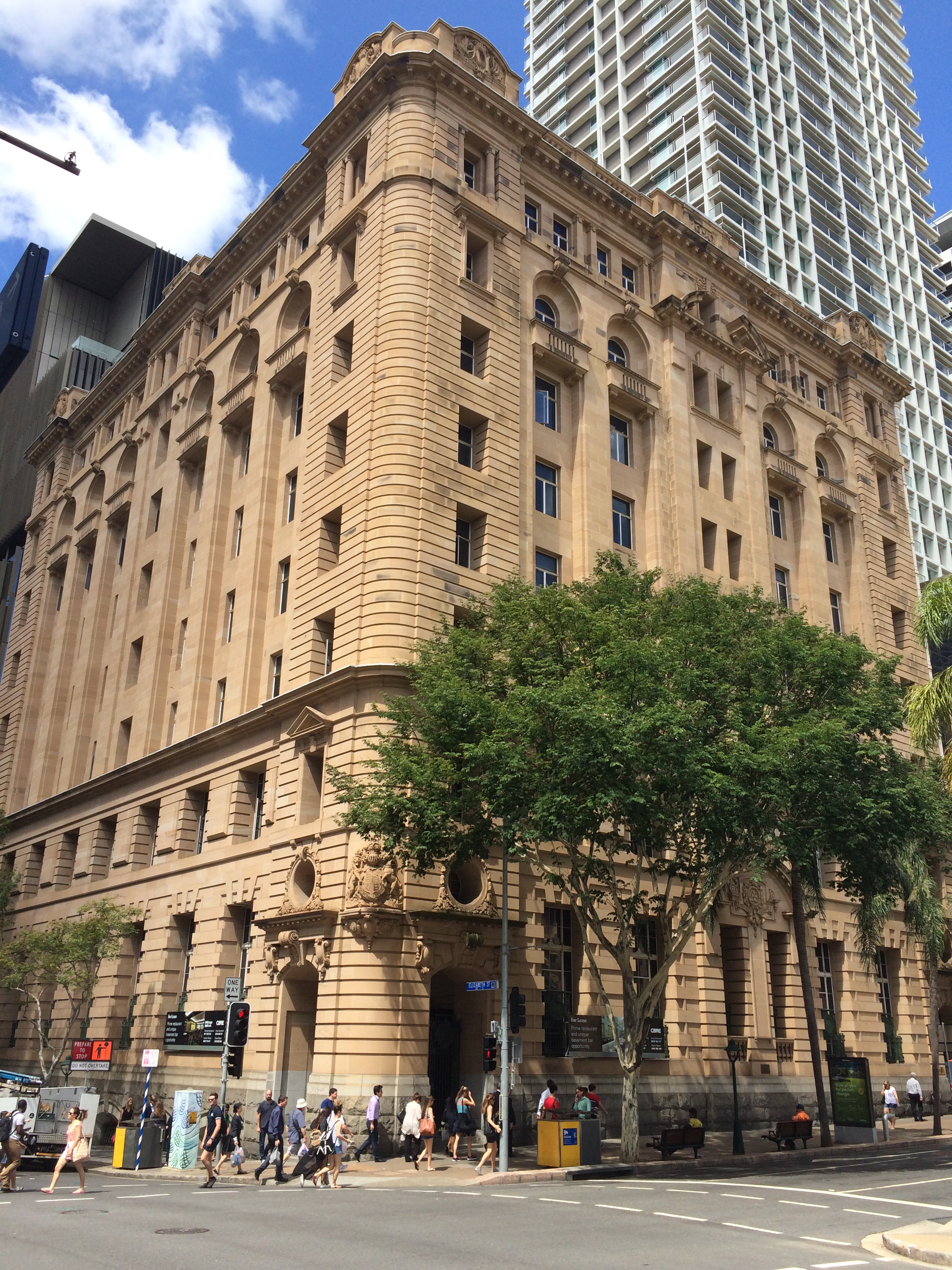
Family Services Building, formerly the Brisbane office of the Queensland Government Savings Bank, 2015

The Queensland Government Savings Bank was a bank in Queensland, Australia. It was operated by the Queensland Government. It was also known as the Government Savings Bank of Queensland.

== History ==
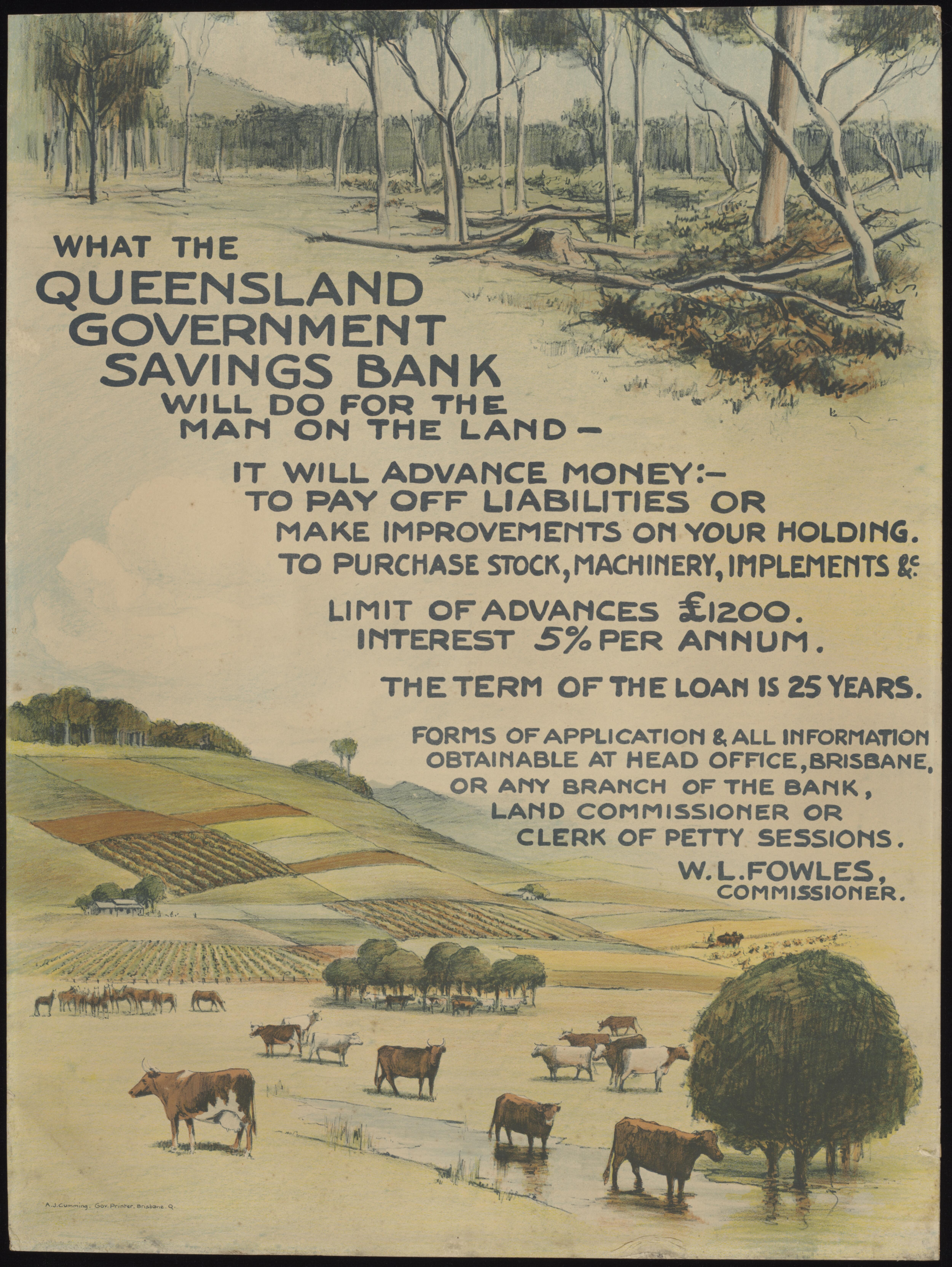
Poster advertising the bank

The Queensland Government Savings Bank was established by one of the earliest pieces of legislation enacted by the government of the new colony of Queensland in 1861. Intended to encourage small deposit saving by working people, savings banks could be established by the gazettal of an application by ten or more house or landholders in any community of more than 500 people. In 1864, the Government Savings Bank Bill provided a government guarantee to protect trustees and deposits and to allow depositors to easily transfer accounts from one town to another.

Over time it absorbed the:

- Moreton Bay Savings Bank (1856–1865)
- Ipswich Savings Bank (1861–1866)
- Toowoomba Savings Bank (1862–1867)

The Commonwealth Bank was founded under the Commonwealth Bank Act 1911. This empowered the bank to transact both savings and trading business under the security of a guarantee from the federal government. It opened its first branch for business on 15 July 1912 in Melbourne and soon opened agencies in post offices throughout Victoria. The Queensland branch was opened on 16 September 1912. Post offices were used as agencies throughout the country as they had been transferred to Commonwealth control after Federation. The Queensland Government Savings Bank merged with the Commonwealth Bank, transferring the business and assets on 8 December 1920.

== Notable buildings ==
Notable buildings occupied by the bank include:

- Commonwealth Bank Building, Mount Morgan
- Family Services Building, Brisbane
- Gympie Lands Office, Gympie
