= Family Services Building =

Heritage-listed building in Brisbane, Queensland

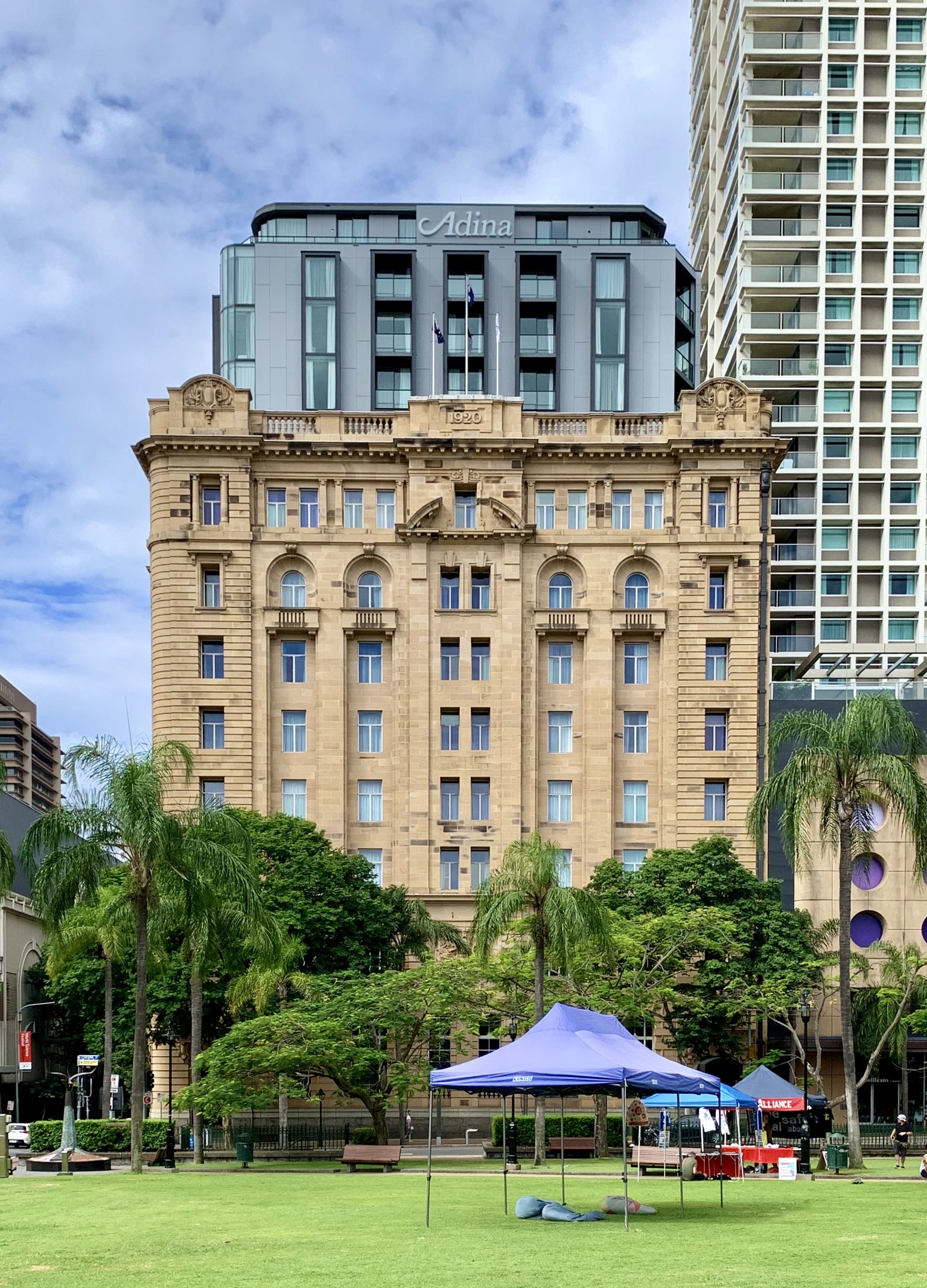
- Family Services Building, 2020

- Location within Queensland Location within Australia
- 27.4717°S 153.0247°E
- Location: 171 George Street, Brisbane City, City of Brisbane, Queensland, Australia

History
- Design period: 1914–1919 (World War I)
- Built: 1914–1922

Site notes
- Architect: George Gerald Hutton
- Architectural style: Classicism

Queensland Heritage Register
- Official name: Family Services Building, Former Administration Building, Queensland Government Insurance Building, Queensland Government Savings Bank
- Type: state heritage (built)
- Designated: 21 October 1992
- Reference no.: 600111
- Significant period: 1910s–1920s (fabric); 1910s–1990s (historical)
- Significant components: banking chamber, strong room

Family Services Building is a heritage-listed office building at 171 George Street, Brisbane City, City of Brisbane, Queensland, Australia. It was designed by George Gerald Hutton and built from 1914 to 1922. It is also formerly known as Administration Building, Queensland Government Insurance Building, and Queensland Government Savings Bank. It was added to the Queensland Heritage Register on 21 October 1992.

== History ==
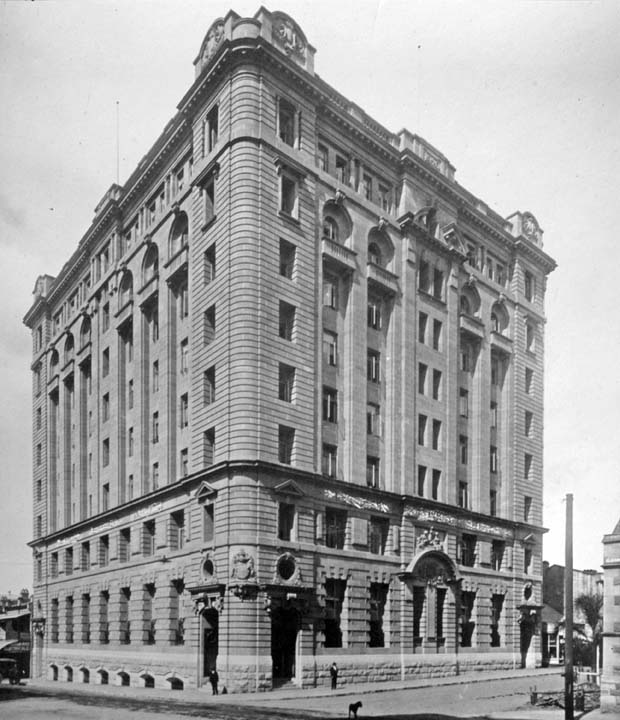
Family Services Building, circa 1922

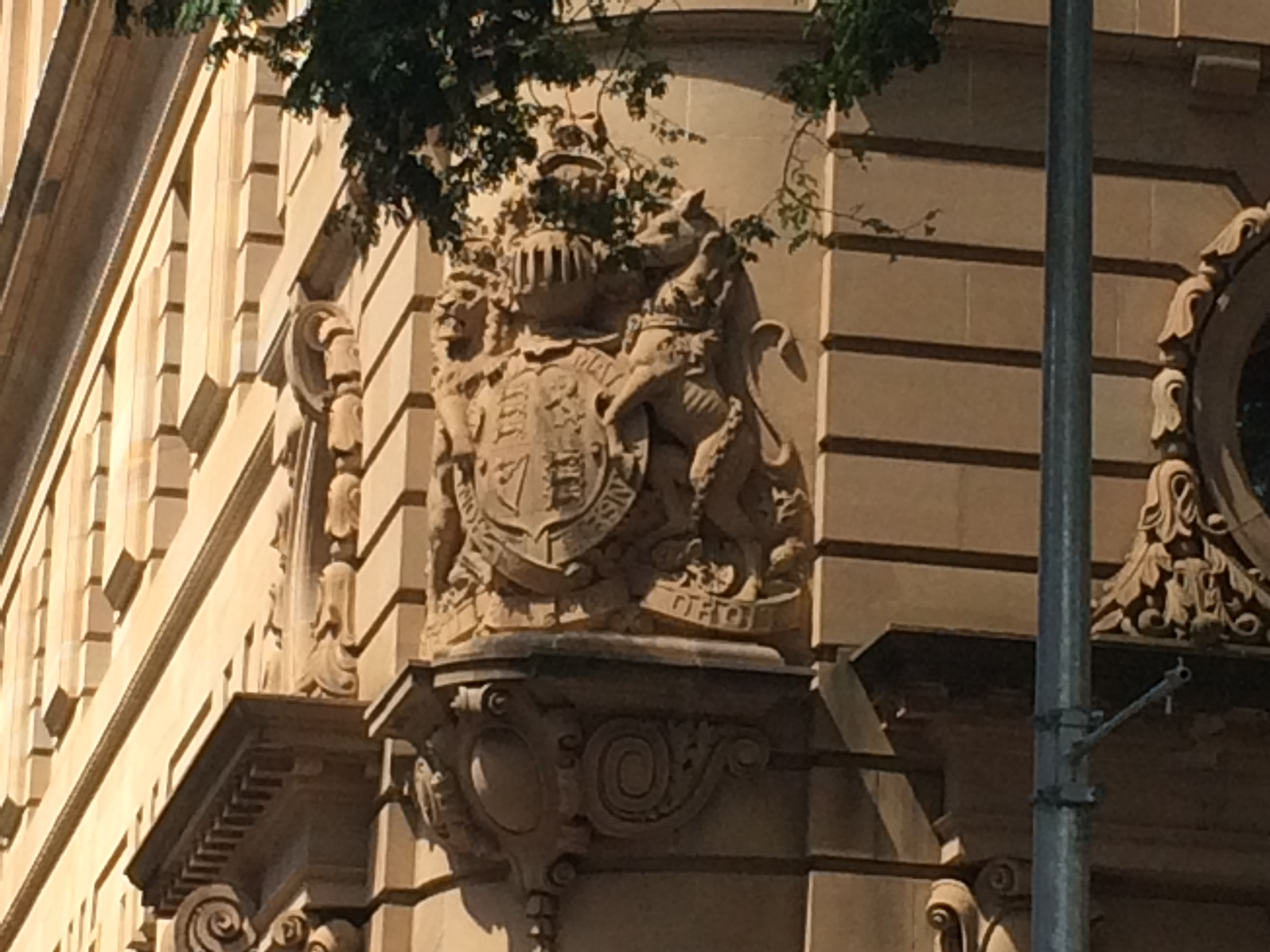
Royal coat of arms sculpture over the entrance on the corner of George and Elizabeth Streets, 2015

Brisbane's first high-rise government office building was constructed between 1914 and 1922. It was intended partly as general public offices, but more importantly as state headquarters for the enormously successful Queensland Government Savings Bank, established in 1864.

The bank headquarters had occupied a purpose-designed banking chamber and offices in the second wing of the Treasury Building from early 1893. By 1912 these premises were no longer adequate. Consequently, the Queensland Government decided to construct a separate and substantial building on the opposite corner of George and Elizabeth Streets, as new bank headquarters.

George Gerald Hutton, assistant architect in the Queensland Government Architect's office from 1913–22, is credited with the design.

It is likely that Hutton also designed the sculpture, representing commerce and industry, on the George Street elevation. This and the royal coat of arms on the George-Elizabeth Street corner were carved in 1920 by Sydney sculptor William Priestly MacIntosh, who had carved an allegorical sculpture for the former Executive Building (later the Land Administration Building) in 1903–04. The shields of the parapet were carved by local masons under MacIntosh's supervision.

Site excavation and the concrete foundations were completed in 1913–14, at a cost of £6,149. In 1914 the contract for the superstructure was let for £113,567, and construction commenced that year. A shortage of structural steel prolonged the work, and completion took close to eight years.

Before the building was finished, the Queensland Labor Government transferred the business and assets of the state bank to the Commonwealth Bank, on 8 December 1920. The nearly completed, purpose-designed Queensland state bank headquarters building was then fitted out for the Queensland Government Insurance Office.

By 1921 the offices had been renamed the Queensland Government Insurance Building. It was completed and fully occupied by mid-1922, with the State Government Insurance Office (SGIO) occupying the basement, ground, and first to third floors. Other first occupants included the State Land Tax Office, the State Industrial Arbitration Court, the Public Service Commissioner, the Public Curator and the Main Roads Board. Most of these had been removed from cramped quarters, in the opposite, Treasury Building. Accommodated on the roof, was the State Time Station's observing room.

From 1925 to 26 Queensland's first official radio broadcaster, the Queensland Radio Service and station 4QG (Queensland Government), which had been established in July 1925, were located in rooms on the roof of the Queensland Government Insurance Building. This necessitated the installation of large aerials on the roof, which were not removed until after 1945. Both 4QG and the Postmaster General's radio station broadcast from the building during the 1930s. From 1930 to 1932, 4QG was part of Australia's first national radio network, the privately owned Australian Broadcasting Company Ltd. In mid-1932, the licence was transferred to the federal government's newly created Australian Broadcasting Commission.

In 1931 the SGIO moved to other premises and the building was occupied principally by the Land and Income Tax Department. Despite income tax being transferred to federal control c.1943, the office block was known as the Taxation Building until 1962.

In 1947 the original lift and concrete staircase in the George Street vestibule were removed, and replaced with a pair of lifts.

In 1962 the building was occupied by the Co-ordinator-General's Department and renamed the Administration Building. With the new tenancy, the George Street vestibule was refitted and the original lift in the Elizabeth Street vestibule was replaced.

From 1963 to 1984 the Health Department was a principal occupant of the Administration Building. Since 1988 the building has been occupied by Family Services, and takes its name from this department.

In 1990 the Elizabeth Street vestibule was partly refurbished.

== Description ==
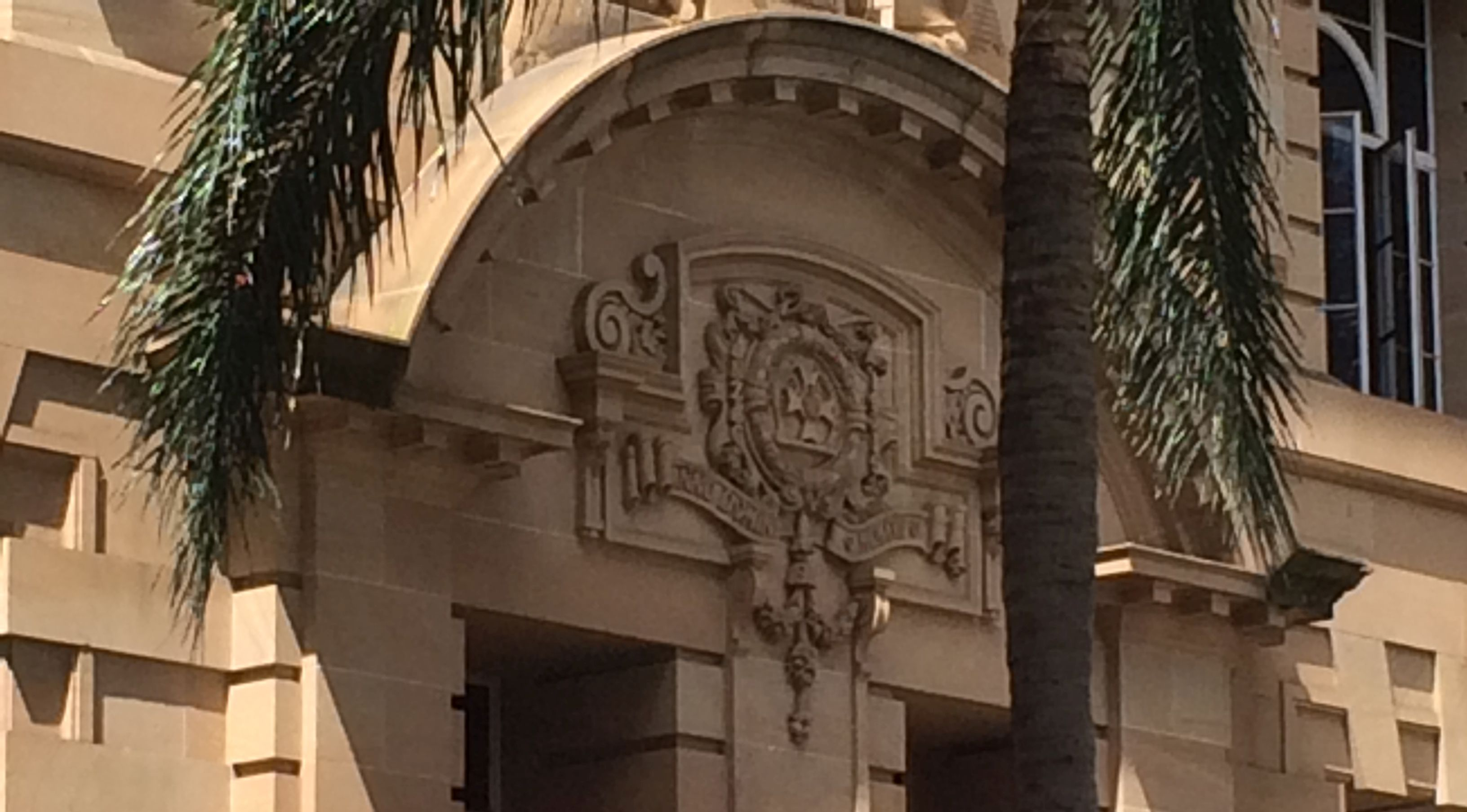
Arched pediment, George Street facade, 2015

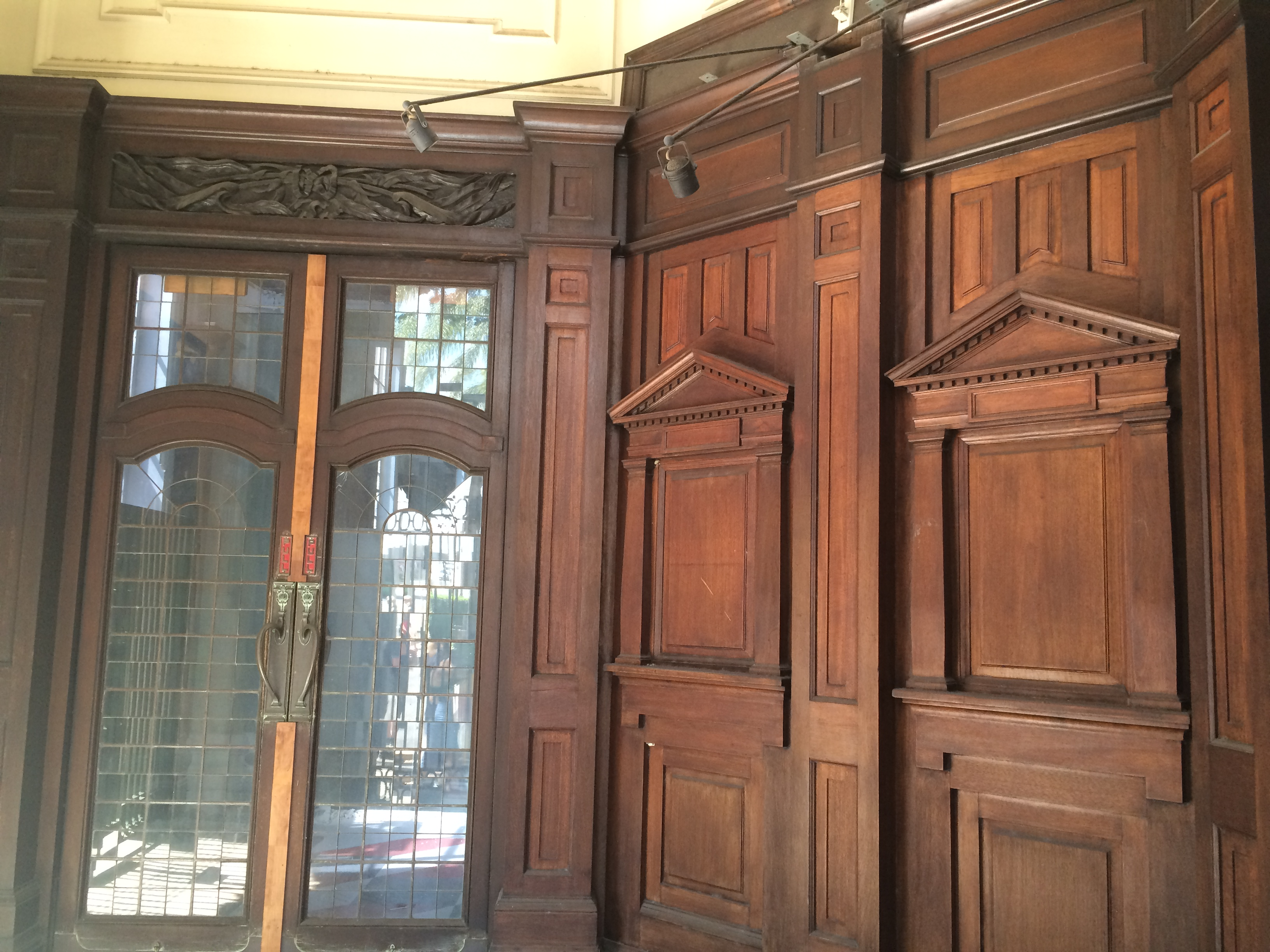
Panelling and timber-and-glass doors, entrance vestibule, Family Services Building, 2015

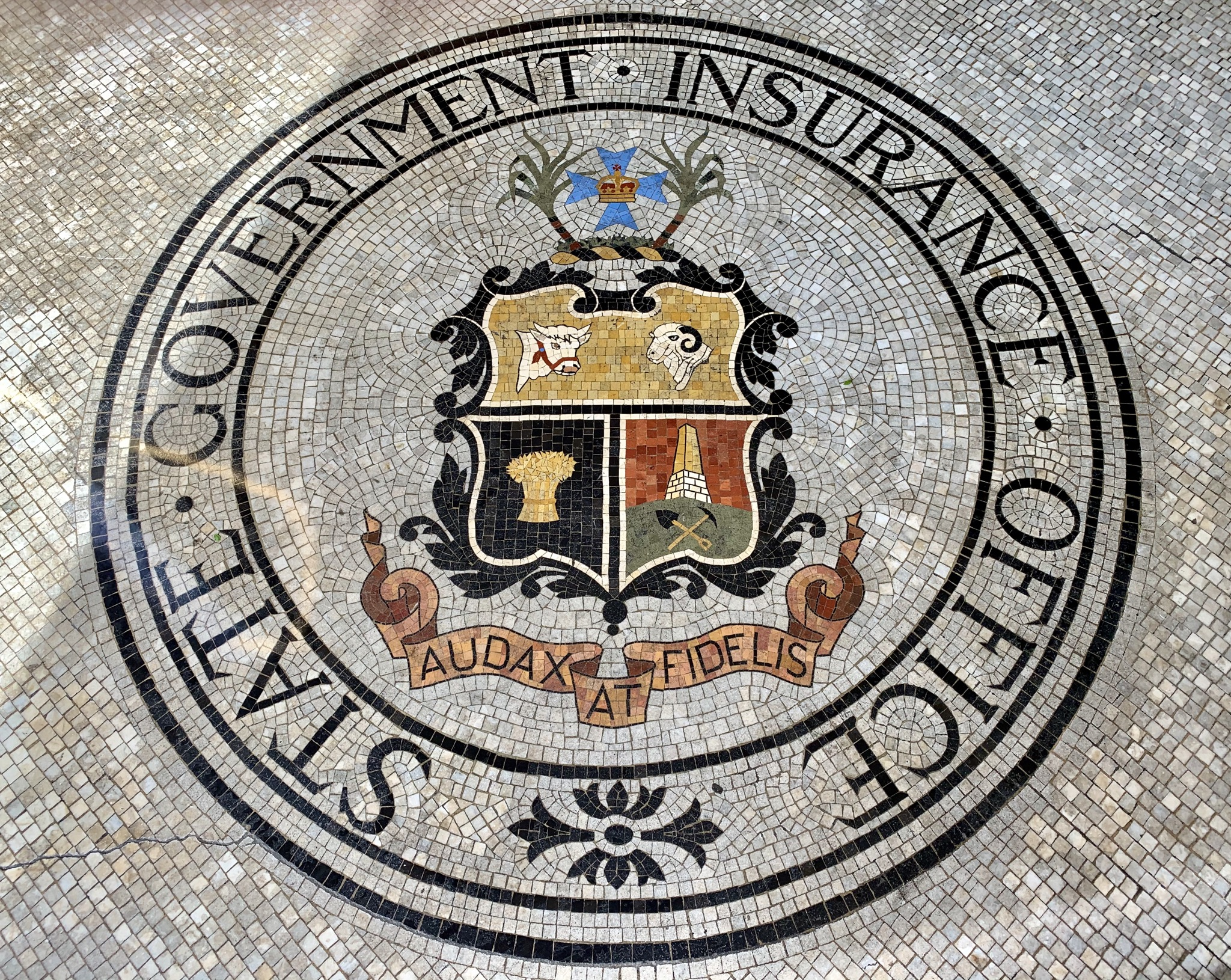
Mosaic tiled floor with State Government Insurance Office logo in entrance vestibule, 2020

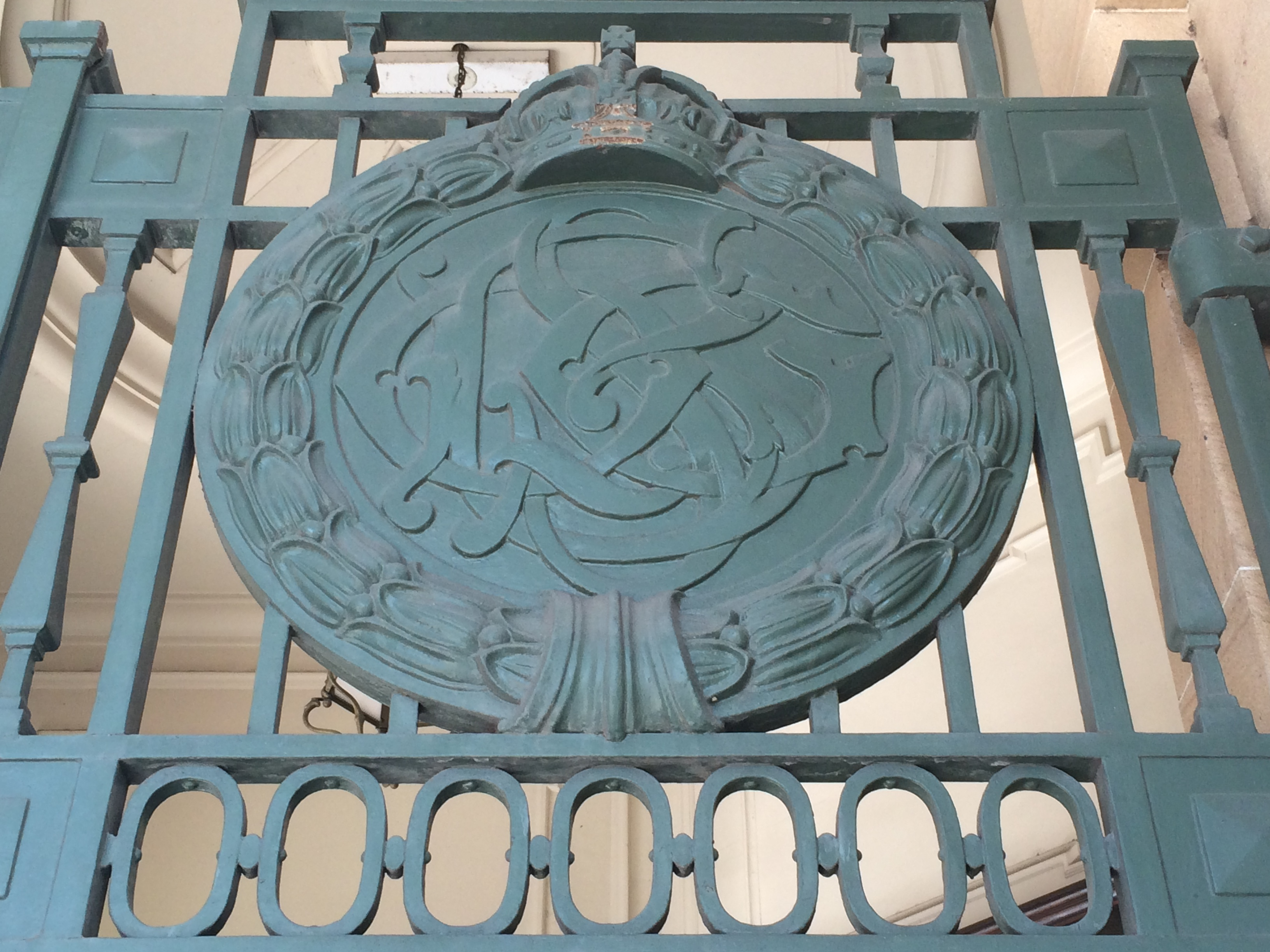
Decorative ironwork on security doors and windows, 2015

The building situated at the corner of George and Elizabeth Streets consists of eight storeys, a basement and rooms on the roof level. The structure, a concrete encased steel frame with brick infill and reinforced concrete floors, is faced on the two street facades with Helidon sandstone sitting on a granite base. The northeast and southeast elevations are constructed of brick with reinforced concrete heads and sills.

The building which overlooks Queens Gardens to the southwest forms part of the group of important government buildings, including the Lands Administration Building, the Treasury Building and the Old State Library, which surround the park.

The Elizabeth and George Street facades are divided vertically, by projecting stone cornices, into three parts. These are, a podium level consisting of the double height ground floor and the first level of offices, a five storeyed middle section and the top floor of the building surmounted by a parapet wall. At the corners of the street elevations pavilions, distinguished by banded rustication, extend from the ground floor to the parapet. The podium level is also marked by banded rustication. In the centre of the George Street elevation on the podium level, is an arched open-bed semicircular pediment supporting a sculpture group that consists of two figures on either side of a shield. The division between the middle and top section of the George Street elevation is embellished by an open-topped semicircular pediment. Steel windows frames and sashes are used throughout the building. Pavement lights are located adjacent to the arched basement windows of the Elizabeth Street elevation.

Public entrances are located on the ground floor of the three corner pavilions. The entrance on the corner of George and Elizabeth Streets leads into the former banking chamber. The George Street entrance and the Elizabeth Street entrance give access to the office levels.

The Elizabeth street entry opens onto a vestibule which has walls and columns finished in pink, grey and black marble, arranged in rectilinear patterns, marble steps, a terrazzo floor and an enriched plaster ceiling, cornice and frieze. The lift enclosure has been paint finished to match the marble walls. The doors leading to the banking chamber have been replaced by a fire door. A fire door at the rear of the vestibule leads to a large square planned reinforced concrete staircase with an ornamental wrought iron balustrade and cedar handrail. The walls above the staircase are lined to dado height with large glazed green tiles. The stairwell, illuminated by a large roof lantern and arched windows, has been converted to a fire isolated exit separated from the office space. A smaller staircase, with similar but less ornate details, is located in the eastern corner of the building and opens onto the banking chamber.

The George Street entry vestibule, once identical to the Elizabeth Street vestibule, is fitted with varnished maple panelling, a suspended vermiculite ceiling and two lifts. Original glass and timber doors between the vestibule and the banking chamber are all that remain of the original fittings.

Two arched stone doorways on the George and Elizabeth Streets corner lead to a mosaic tiled vestibule with a domed plaster ceiling and a timber panelled screen wall enriched with carving and pilasters. Built into the screen are two sets of timber and glass double doors that open onto the former banking chamber. This grand double height room is now obscured by two levels of offices that have been built into the space. The lower section of the walls is lined with carved timber panelling while the rendered upper section is embellished with delicate plaster detailing. Ionic columns and pilasters support a richly ornamented plaster ceiling.

All the office floors, from the first floor to the top floor, are similar. An open plan with large columns is divided by modern office partitioning and suspended ceilings conceal the original ceilings. Heavily reinforced concrete strong rooms and safes are located in the basement with smaller strong rooms on each floor. The lightwell, on the southeast side of the building, contains steel fire escape stairs and steel and concrete walkways. A brick and concrete extension accessed from the walkway has been built into the lightwell and the large windows to the banking chamber and offices have been bricked in. Former photographic rooms, the staircase lantern, toilets, stores, elevator and plant enclosures, are located on the flat roof of the building.

The exterior of the building is intact. The interior while apparently much altered retains many original features, both visible and obscured.

== Heritage listing ==
Family Services Building was listed on the Queensland Heritage Register on 21 October 1992 having satisfied the following criteria.

The place is important in demonstrating the evolution or pattern of Queensland's history.

The Family Services Building is significant as Queensland's first government high-rise office block, and the most important building constructed by the Queensland government in the second decade of the twentieth century.

The place is important because of its aesthetic significance.

The Family Services Building is significant as an integral member of the most prominent, important and cohesive group of government buildings in Queensland. Further, the Family Services Building is significant for its townscape contribution, particularly in relation to the adjacent historic buildings and sites.

Significant as an early use of steel-framed high-rise construction in Queensland, the Family Services Building is also a design which exhibits detailing.

The place is important in demonstrating a high degree of creative or technical achievement at a particular period.

Significant as an early use of steel-framed high-rise construction in Queensland, the Family Services Building is also an accomplished building in design, materials and workmanship, which exhibits particularly fine and inventive detailing, and is important for the aesthetic quality of the sculptural work.

The place has a special association with the life or work of a particular person, group or organisation of importance in Queensland's history.

The Family Services Building is significant as the major work of later Queensland government architect GG Hutton and for its association with government administration for over seven decades.
