= Mooneys Building =

Heritage-listed building in Brisbane, Queensland

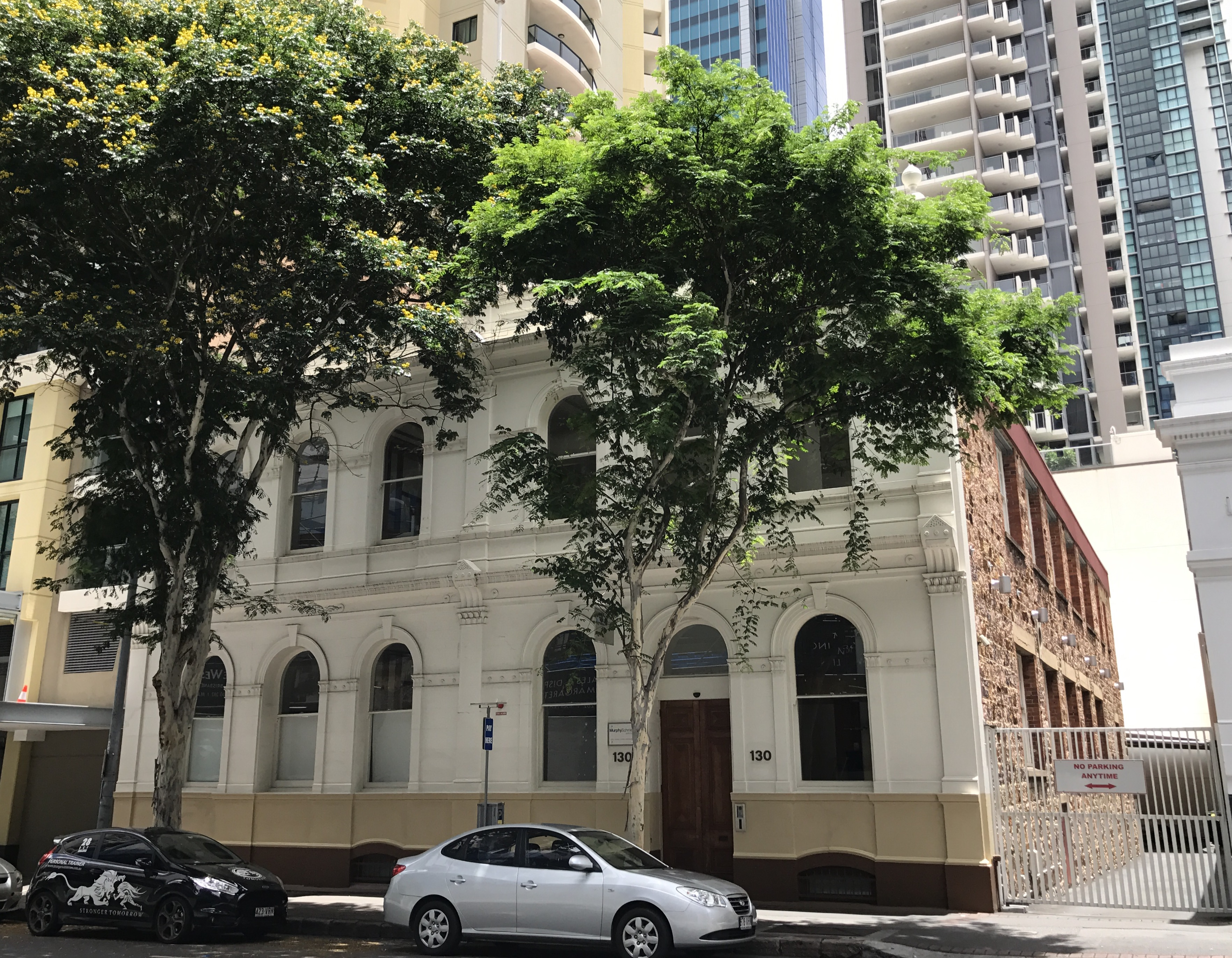
- Mooneys Building, 2017

- Location within Queensland
- 27.4711°S 153.028°E
- Location: 130-132 Mary Street, Brisbane City, City of Brisbane, Queensland, Australia

History
- Design period: 1870s - 1890s (late 19th century)
- Built: 1883 - 1883

Site notes
- Architect: Francis Drummond Greville Stanley
- Architectural style: Italianate

Queensland Heritage Register
- Official name: Mooneys Building
- Type: state heritage (built)
- Designated: 22 June 1993
- Reference no.: 600130
- Significant period: 1883 (fabric); 1883-1919, 1919-1980 (historical)
- Builders: James S Martin

Mooneys Building is a heritage-listed warehouse at 130-132 Mary Street, Brisbane City, City of Brisbane, Queensland, Australia. It was designed by Francis Drummond Greville Stanley and built in 1883 by James S Martin. It was added to the Queensland Heritage Register on 22 June 1993.

== History ==
This warehouse was erected in 1883 for William Mooney, a Brisbane wholesale and retail tobacconist. Designed by former Queensland Colonial Architect Francis Drummond Greville Stanley, it was constructed by J S Martin for approximately £3,000.

In 1891, the building was transferred to William Perry (of Perry Bros, ironmongers), who died soon after the change of ownership, and for more than twenty years the property remained in Perry's trust estate. In 1901, manufacturing chemists Taylor & Colledge occupied the building. From 1908 to 1919 the building was tenanted by John M Mooney a crockery, cutlery, glassware and general merchant. In August 1919, the Australian Government purchased the building from the Perry estate trustees for £6,500. At the time the building was described as:

an old but substantial building in good condition. There is no ceiling or lining and the walls of stone and heavy beams and posts of ironbark are exposed.

Since mid-1915 the Australian Government had been planning a repatriation scheme for the hundreds of thousands of soldiers expected to return from World War I. Newly formed state war councils, such as the Queensland War Council, were charged with various responsibilities aimed at settling returned soldiers into peace-time occupations. The permanent body responsible for soldier resettlement, the Repatriation Department, was formed in April 1918, and the Queensland Branch moved into Mooneys Building in the following year. The branch administered soldier employment, training for trades, medical and general assistance to soldiers as well as provision of welfare to soldiers and/or families of soldiers killed or incapacitated.

The Repatriation Department remained in the building until the 1950s. The building was subsequently occupied by another defence authority, the Recruiting Directorate. In 1980, the property was sold again.

== Description ==
Mooneys Building is a two-storeyed stone building with a basement. It adjoins Perkins Stables and a laneway between 138 Mary Street and has Charlotte House and Harrolds Marine located behind addressing Charlotte Street.

The building is divided into two symmetrical portions that reflect the original subdivision of land. The rendered facade is designed with restrained moulded Italianate detailing of predominantly horizontal banding. The facade is divided horizontally by a string course and vertically by pilasters. There are three arched openings on both levels of each section. Decorative elements include architraves, pilasters, keystones, horizontal mouldings, rosettes, ornamental urns and triangular pediments centrally placed in the parapet.

The side and rear walls of the building are unrendered porphyry (Brisbane Tuff) with some sandstone. Openings appear to have been made to the laneway on both levels. At the rear, the gable roof forms of both portions of the building are clearly expressed. All but one of the upper level openings have been changed; however the original brick archways for the openings remain.

Internally the building retains much of its post-and-beam timber structure, with floors supported by timber joists separated by herring-bone strutting. The roof structure is exposed timber trusses. The interior of the building otherwise incorporates modern office partitioning.

== Heritage listing ==
Mooneys Building was listed on the Queensland Heritage Register on 22 June 1993 having satisfied the following criteria.

The place is important in demonstrating the evolution or pattern of Queensland's history.

Mooneys Building is important in demonstrating the principal characteristics of an 1880s stone warehouse with its facade designed in Italianate style.

The place is important because of its aesthetic significance.

In its style, scale and materials, Mooneys Building exhibits a contribution to the immediate streetscape, which includes Perkins Stables and 138 Mary Street, which is valued by the community.

The place is important in demonstrating the principal characteristics of a particular class of cultural places.

Mooneys Building is important in demonstrating the principal characteristics of an 1880s stone warehouse with its facade designed in Italianate style.

The place has a special association with the life or work of a particular person, group or organisation of importance in Queensland's history.

The building has a special association with former Queensland colonial architect FDG Stanley, as an example of his commercial work.
