= 169 Mary Street, Brisbane =

Heritage-listed warehouse in Queensland, Australia

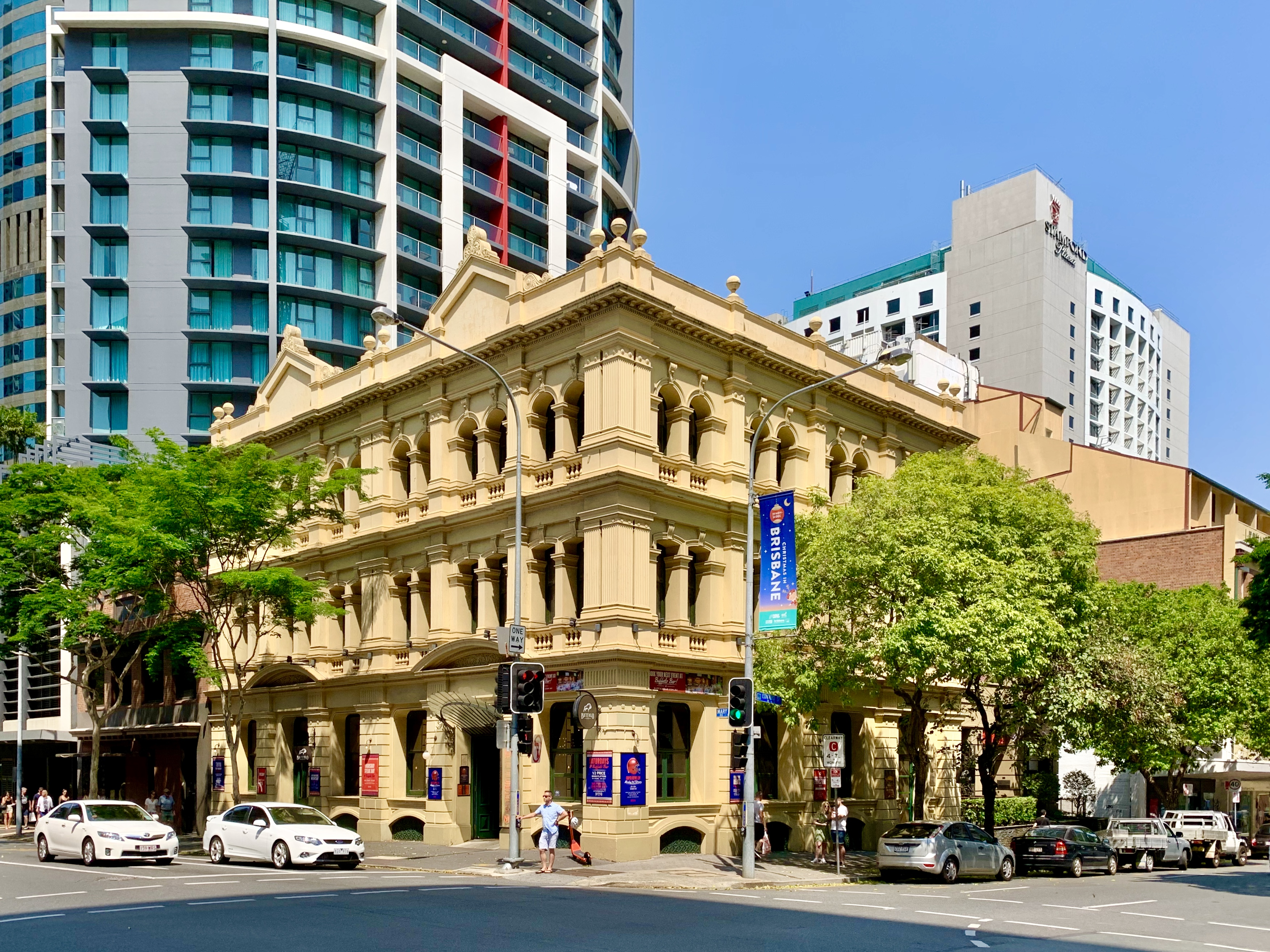
- 169 Mary Street, 2019

- Location within Queensland
- 27.4707°S 153.0295°E
- Location: 169 Mary Street, Brisbane City, City of Brisbane, Queensland, Australia

History
- Design period: 1870s–1890s (late 19th century)
- Built: 1887–1888

Site notes
- Architect: Richard Gailey

Queensland Heritage Register
- Official name: 169 Mary Street, Coal Board Building
- Type: state heritage (built)
- Designated: 21 October 1992
- Reference no.: 600132
- Significant period: 1887–1888 (fabric); 1888–1960 (historical)
- Significant components: toilet block/earth closet/water closet, other – retail/wholesale/services: component
- Builders: T Game

169 Mary Street is a heritage-listed warehouse at 169 Mary Street (corner of Edward Street), Brisbane CBD, City of Brisbane, Queensland, Australia. It was designed by Richard Gailey and built from 1887 to 1888 by T Game. It is also known as Coal Board Building. It was added to the Queensland Heritage Register on 21 October 1992.

== History ==
This three-storeyed masonry warehouse was erected in 1887–1888 for Queensland pastoralists and politicians William Allan, MLA and William Graham, MLC.

The land was granted first to John Balfour in 1852. In 1885 the property was transferred to William Allan, then in 1887 he was joined by William Graham as tenants in common. Both Allan and Graham came from Edinburgh originally, and had a number of business interests in common, including sitting on the first board of the Royal Bank of Queensland, established in 1885, and were closely associated with BD Morehead & Co. An expansion of commercial and building activity in Brisbane in the 1880s transformed the streets around lower Edward Street, which were close to the wharves along the town reach of the Brisbane River, into a warehouse precinct. Built as an investment, Allan and Graham's warehouse reflects this development phase, and remains one of a small group of late Victorian warehouses surviving in Brisbane. Other comparable buildings include the Metro Arts Building (1890), Spencer's Building (1890) and the Brisbane and Area Water Board Building (1886) in Edward Street, Charlotte House (1888) in Charlotte Street, Watson Brothers Building (1887) in Margaret Street, and Tara House (1878) and Heckelmann's Building (1891) in Elizabeth Street.

In January 1887, architect Richard Gailey called tenders for the erection of a warehouse at the corner of Edward and Mary Streets. Constructed by Brisbane contractor T Game at a cost of £4,295, the building was completed in 1888. First leased by J & B Sniders, importers of china and glass, the warehouse was subsequently used by McMurtie & Co. (boot manufacturers), and a variety of produce and leather merchants, engineers, hardware suppliers and saddlers' ironmongers.

From 1900 to 1914 the property was owned by the Gibson family of Bingera Plantation, near Bundaberg, and between 1928 and 1960 was owned and occupied by Mauri Brothers and Thomson Ltd. The property was purchased by the Commissioner of Main Roads in 1960 and transferred to the Crown in 1968. Since then the building has been used as offices for the Queensland Government and community groups.

== Description ==
The former Coal Board building, located on the eastern corner of Edward and Mary Streets opposite Young's Building, Optical Products, is a three-storeyed rendered masonry structure, with basement, and a corrugated iron twin gable roof concealed behind a parapet wall.

The building is divided into two equal portions, with a central masonry wall with two arched openings per floor, which are expressed on the Mary Street facade. Each portion consists of three bays, separated by pilasters with cornices between each floor, and surmounted by a solid parapet with a central triangular pediment flanked by spherical finials. The building has one street entrance, located in the central bay of the corner portion.

The ground floor has a single large sash window to each bay, with basement windows covered by cast iron screens below. The central bay has a curved pediment and the pilasters are scribed to imitate stonework. The first floor has twin sashes, with shallow arched window heads and rendered mouldings, and a concrete balustrade below to each bay. The second floor is similar, but with rounded window heads.

The Edward Street facade, divided into four bays, is treated similarly but the ground floor sashes have been altered. The rear wall, which is not rendered, is of English bond brickwork.

The main entry has twin panelled timber doors, with fanlight, opening into a vestibule with glazed timber doors and a lower hardboard ceiling with timber cover strips. The ground floor has sections of pressed metal ceilings near the entrance, with hardboard ceilings throughout the rest of the space. A staircase, with turned timber balustrade, is located at the south corner of the building. An early goods lift, located at the southeast, has a folding metal door and is surmounted by the lift motor room on the roof.

The first floor has panelled ceilings with timber coverstrips, and the second floor has hardboard ceilings. The basement has a concrete floor, and steel columns and beams have been inserted to support the floor above.

A three-storeyed masonry toilet block and steel fire stair are built at the rear and are connected by concrete walkways. Car-parking space is also located at the rear fronting Edward Street.

== Heritage listing ==
169 Mary Street was listed on the Queensland Heritage Register on 21 October 1992 having satisfied the following criteria.

The place is important in demonstrating the evolution or pattern of Queensland's history.

169 Mary Street is important in demonstrating the pattern of Queensland's history, providing evidence of the former important warehousing function of the lower Edward Street area.

The place is important in demonstrating the principal characteristics of a particular class of cultural places.

169 Mary Street is important in demonstrating the principal characteristics of an ornate late Victorian warehouse, whose style, scale and detail self-consciously express 1880s optimism.

The place is important because of its aesthetic significance.

169 Mary Street is important in exhibiting aesthetic characteristics valued by the community, in particular the important contribution which the rhythm and scale of its facade make to both Edward and Mary Streets.

The place has a special association with the life or work of a particular person, group or organisation of importance in Queensland's history.

169 Mary Street has a special association with the work of architect Richard Gailey, whose firm made a significant contribution to the townscape of Brisbane in the 1880s.
