= 138 Mary Street, Brisbane =

Heritage-listed building in Brisbane, Queensland

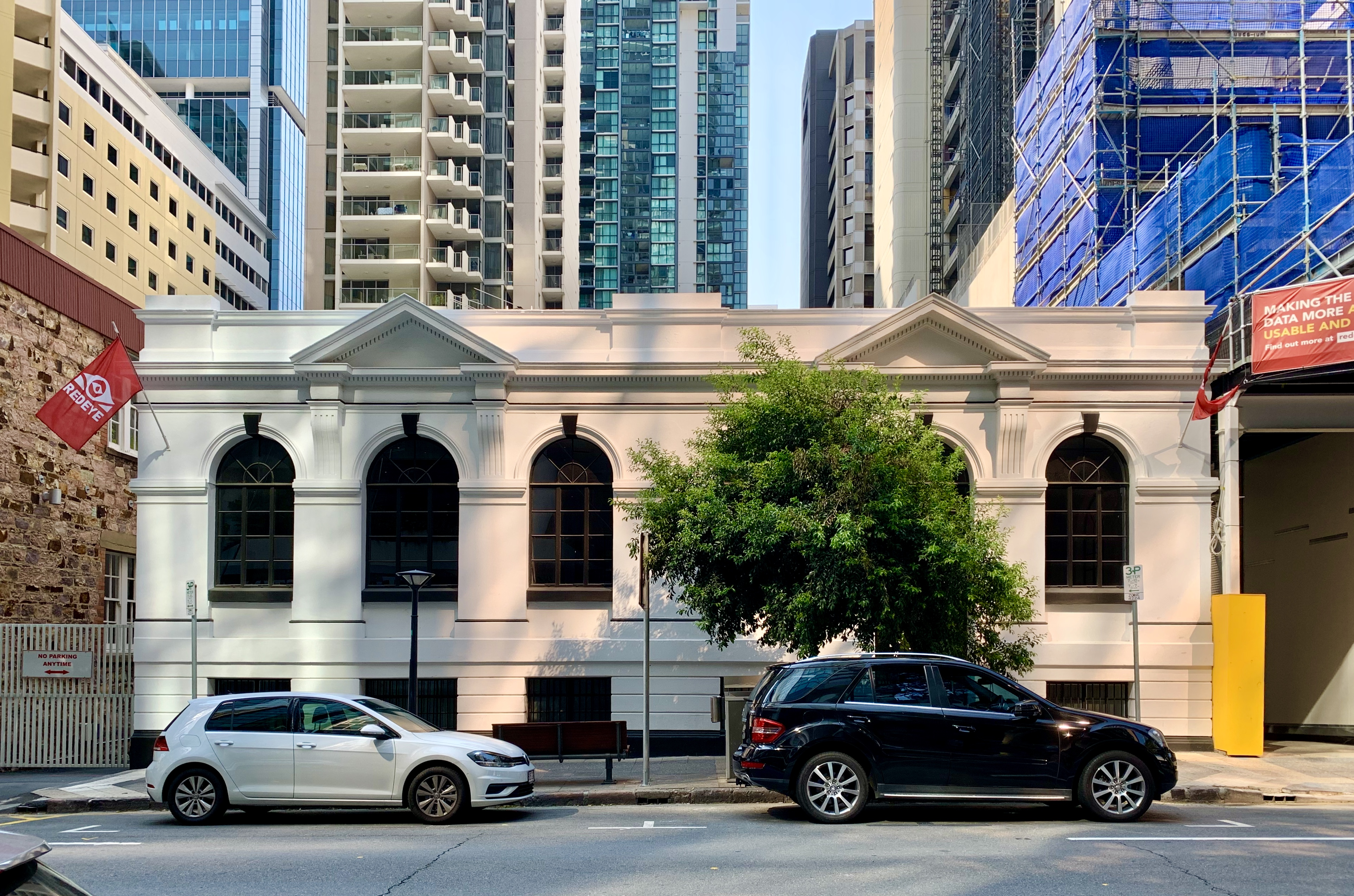
- 138 Mary Street, Brisbane, 2019

- Location within Queensland
- 27.471°S 153.0282°E
- Location: 138 Mary Street, Brisbane CBD, City of Brisbane, Queensland, Australia

History
- Design period: 1900–1914 (early 20th century)
- Built: c. 1901
- Built for: Perkins Brewery

Queensland Heritage Register
- Official name: 138 Mary Street, Buzzards, Perkins Wine & Spirit Store
- Type: state heritage (built)
- Designated: 21 October 1992
- Reference no.: 600131
- Significant period: c. 1901–c. 1913 (fabric) c. 1901–1943 (historical)
- Significant components: loading bay/dock, store/s / storeroom / storehouse, laneway, warehouse, other – retail/wholesale/services: component, courtyard

138 Mary Street, Brisbane is a heritage-listed wine and spirits storehouse in Mary Street, Brisbane CBD, Queensland, Australia. It was built in about 1901 for Perkins Brewery (now Castlemaine Perkins). It is also known as Buzzards and Perkins Wine & Spirit Store. It was added to the Queensland Heritage Register on 21 October 1992.

== History ==
This building was erected c. 1901 for Perkins Brewery. Brisbane's first brewery, the City Brewery was established in Mary Street in the 1860s. In 1972, the City Brewery was bought by Toowoomba brewers Patrick and Thomas Perkins. The business expanded rapidly under their control, and by the 1880s occupied a large portion of land between Mary and Margaret Streets. The Perkins complex, particularly the six-storeyed brewing tower, dominated this part of the city.

The need for increased space prompted the purchase of 138 Mary Street in 1899. By 1902 Perkins & Co had erected a building on the site which they used as a Wine & Spirit store. This building was probably to a design of Richard Gailey as he had worked on other buildings for the Perkins company.

In 1928, Perkins merged with another prominent Brisbane brewing firm to form Castlemaine Perkins Ltd and from that time the Perkins operations were gradually moved from the city to the Castlemaine site at Milton. In 1937, fire severely damaged the main Perkins complex opposite. Only this building, and the former stables at 124 Mary Street, survive from what was once a large inner city industrial complex. In 1943, the building was sold to Alfred Lawrence & Co Ltd, manufacturing chemists. Alfred Lawrence & Co Ltd retained ownership of the building until 1977.

== Description ==
The storehouse is a small commercial building and store located at 138 Mary Street nearby to Perkins Stables and Mooneys Building with Harolds Marine and Charlotte House behind.

A single level brick building has a stone basement half exposed at footpath level. Its facade has been rendered and painted a cream colour. The facade is divided into two nearly identical symmetrical portions each with three major arched openings. The middle opening of each portion is slightly wider than the other openings and above them are triangular pediments at parapet level supported on moulded brackets. The facade treatment to the plinth is rendered and coursed to resemble ashlar. A string course runs across between the openings at the springing level of the arches. The semi-circular arches have moulded surrounds and keystones. A dentilled cornice line runs below the parapet in line with the base of the triangular pediments. The original entry is in the centre of the eastern bay and two new entries have been placed in the facade to match the original opening. Laneways run down both sides of the building and there are a series of square headed openings down each side to take advantage of natural light. At the rear a plain brick L-shape building forms a courtyard with the back of the front building. This would seem to be a later addition (before 1913) having shallow broad arched brick openings. The connecting narrow part of the building has a loading bay at first floor level.

Internally, the front building has some stonework visible in the basement but upstairs has been refurbished. Much of the original floor structure of the rear building is visible from the basement level.

== Heritage listing ==
138 Mary Street was listed on the Queensland Heritage Register on 21 October 1992 having satisfied the following criteria.

The place is important in demonstrating the evolution or pattern of Queensland's history.

An important remnant of a major industrial brewing complex significant in the industrial and commercial history of the State.

The place is important in demonstrating the principal characteristics of a particular class of cultural places.

As a fine example of a small, commercial building of the early 1900s.

The place is important because of its aesthetic significance.

For the contribution of its style, scale and form to the immediate streetscape which includes Mooneys Building and Perkins Stables.

The place has a special association with the life or work of a particular person, group or organisation of importance in Queensland's history.

For its association with Perkins breweries.
