= John Mills' residence =

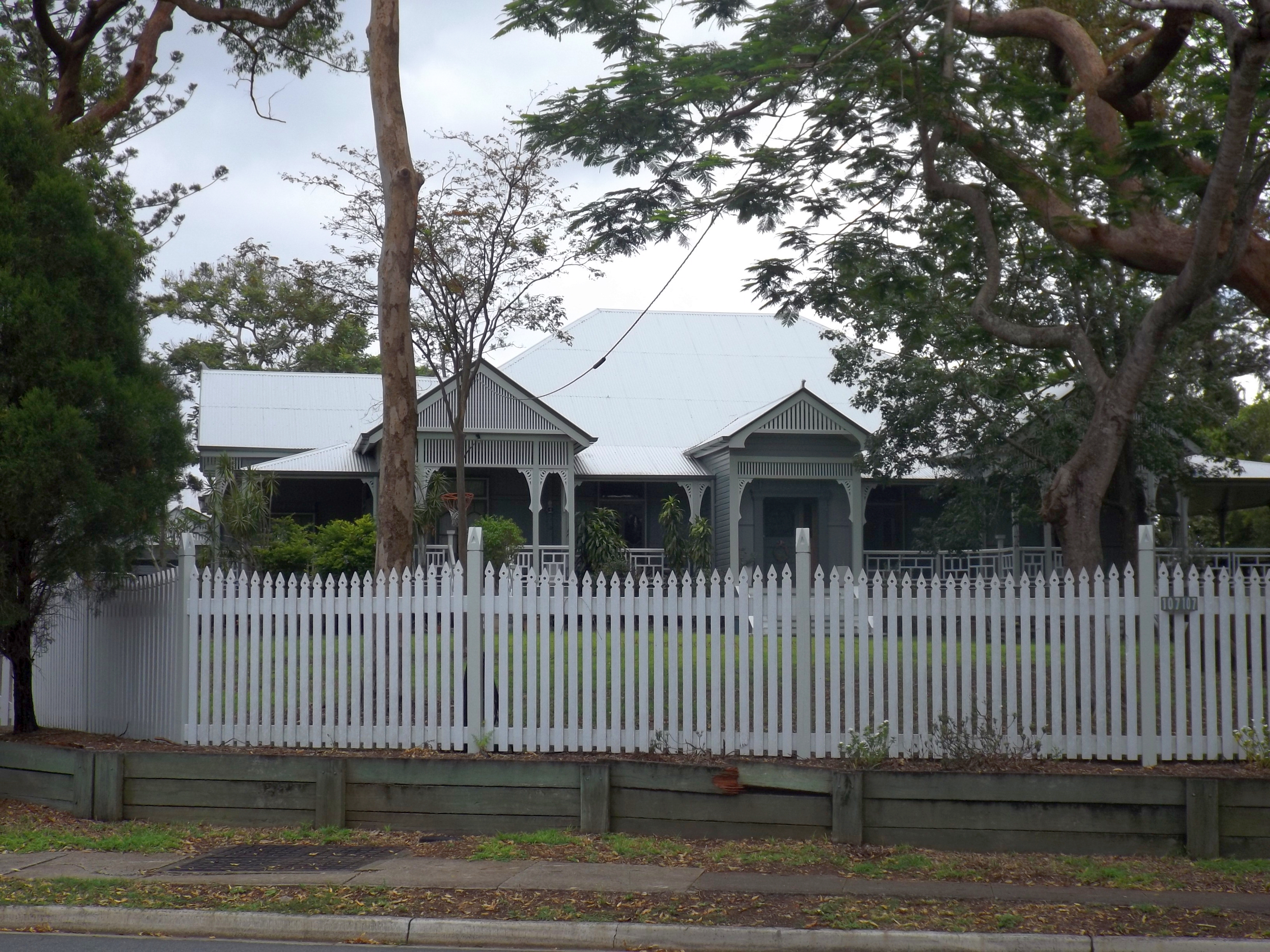
- Building, front yard and fence in 2015

- Location within Queensland Location within Australia
- 27.5148°S 153.012°E
- Location: 107 Kadumba Street, Yeronga, City of Brisbane, Queensland, Australia

History
- Design period: 1914–1919 (World War I)
- Built: c. 1914/1915

Queensland Heritage Register
- Official name: Residence, 107 Kadumba Street (c1914), John Mills' Residence
- Type: state heritage (landscape, built)
- Designated: 25 August 2000
- Reference no.: 601472
- Significant period: 1910s (fabric, historical)
- Significant components: skylight/s, shed – shelter, garden/grounds, residential accommodation – main house, trees – remnant scrub

John Mills' residence is a heritage-listed villa at 107 Kadumba Street, Yeronga, City of Brisbane, Queensland, Australia. It was built c. 1914/1915. It was added to the Queensland Heritage Register on 25 August 2000.

== History ==
This house was erected c. 1914/1915 for John Charles Mills and his wife Sarah, who purchased the Yeronga site, which then comprised nearly 2 acres (0.81 ha), in October 1913. The transfer was registered in the name of Sarah Mills in January 1915. A map of the Kitchener Estate at Yeronga, which was auctioned on 24 April 1915, refers to John Mills' new residence, and it is likely the house was completed by this date.

John Mills was a successful Brisbane printer, who traded from Adelaide Street as Mills and Green, printers and stationers, in the early years of the 20th century. From 1909, however, Mills was trading as John Mills Himself. During the First World War his business expanded, with a warehouse established at Newstead, and in 1919 he erected new brick premises at 40 Charlotte Street, Brisbane (John Mills Himself Building), designed by Brisbane architect John Henry Burley of Queen Street. By the 1920s the business was well established, attracting clients such as Steele Rudd. After his death, the business was conducted by his sons, John and Sam, and remained in the family until the 1980s.

It is possible that JH Burley also designed the Mills' Kadumba Street residence. Burley established a sound architectural practice in southeast Queensland in the late 19th and early 20th centuries, his residential work including St Joseph's Presbytery at Kangaroo Point (1899), Bellissima Guest House at Canungra for the Lahey family (1916) and Inverness, the Nestles Company's manager's house at Toogoolawah (1917).

John and Sarah Mills resided at Kadumba Street (the section between Grimes and Douglas Streets was known as Dunn Street until 1946) from c. 1915. John died in 1934, but his wife remained in their Yeronga home until her death in 1953. The property then passed to Queensland Trustees Ltd and was sold to Frederick William Filer and James Francis Swengley in 1954. In 1958 the house, on a reduced site, passed to James Francis and Grace Agnes Swengley, and they sold this property to Keith Eric Watt in 1962. In 1989 it was acquired by heritage conservation writer Ian Evans, who restored the house and grounds.

== Description ==
107 Kadumba Street is a large, picturesque single-storeyed timber residence, with a corrugated iron roof and timber verandahs. The house is one of a group of three adjacent substantial late 19th and early 20th century timber residences on Kadumba Street screened by a streetscape of mature trees, and contributes to both the streetscape of Kadumba Street and the townscape of Yeronga.

This deep plan house is covered by a capacious hipped roof with three projecting gables to the street-facing elevation to the south and one to the west, and sits above ground level on timber stumps in-filled with timber batten screens. It is encircled by verandahs of varying depths: narrow to the north for service access; more generous to the south for entrance areas; deeper again to the west adjacent to bedrooms, and forming a large outdoor room adjacent to bedrooms and kitchen to the east (an early extension). The verandah ceilings vary in height; flat under gables and raked elsewhere. The house is clad in chamferboard to gable ends and rear service areas, and vertically jointed timber with externally expressed framing in areas protected by verandahs. External rooms open onto verandahs with timber double doors with curved mullions and fanlights.

The southern, street facing elevation has three gabled bays with central stairs; the central, smaller bay is enclosed and forms the main entrance to the house. The bays either side have double square posts, with curvilinear valances, and a spandrel panel of timber battens above. The central bay also has valances, a smaller batten frieze, gable battening, and marbled timber door surrounds.

The house has a symmetrically organised plan, comprising two finely decorated major central rooms - a Drawing Room to the south and Billiard Room to the north, flanked by wings of bedrooms, with the kitchen in the north west corner. The entrance lobby projects into the Drawing Room, and has a front door with coloured glass surrounds, and small side doors with coloured glass panels. The Drawing Room is a generously proportioned and finely finished space, with a timber boarded ceiling with raked edges and a central coloured glass rooflight, and a frieze running between a timber picture rail and cornice. The door between the Drawing Room and Billiard Room has fine coloured glass panels in timber surrounds. The Billiard Room is encircled with "grained" painted timber panels which run under a silky oak shelf at lintel height, with vertically jointed timber above, finishing in a stencilled frieze running between a timber picture rail and cornice. The north-eastern corner of the room has a diagonally placed fireplace with glazed ceramic tiles, and silky oak mantelpiece and cabinet above. The western end has a large mirror in richly carved surrounds, while the northern wall forms a bay with a central window, and has double doors either side of the bay. Bedrooms all are lined with vertically-jointed timber walls and ceilings, and have fretwork fanlights above the doors.

A weatherboard tennis shed, part of the grounds prior to subdivision and now moved to a new site, is located in the south-west corner of the rear garden, having been moved from another site. The front yard contains a number of mature tallowwoods, thought to be part of the original forest.

== Heritage listing ==
Residence, 107 Kadumba Street (c1914) was listed on the Queensland Heritage Register on 25 August 2000 having satisfied the following criteria.

The place is important in demonstrating the evolution or pattern of Queensland's history.

107 Kadumba Street is significant historically as important evidence of the evolution of Yeronga as a middle-class residential suburb, established as such in the late 19th century, and sustained into the second half of the 20th century.

The place has potential to yield information that will contribute to an understanding of Queensland's history.

It has the potential to reveal further information about late 19th/early 20th century Brisbane architects and their work, and may prove to be a fine example of the work of Brisbane architect JH Burley.

The place is important in demonstrating the principal characteristics of a particular class of cultural places.

It is a substantial, picturesque, early 20th century timber residence set in a garden of mature Tallowwood trees, and contains particularly fine interiors.

The place is important because of its aesthetic significance.

As one of a group of similarly substantial late 19th and early 20th century timber residences on Kadumba Street, the building contributes to the streetscape of Kadumba Street and to the townscape of Yeronga.

The place has a special association with the life or work of a particular person, group or organisation of importance in Queensland's history.

The place is significant also for its association with successful Brisbane printer John Charles Mills, who from 1909 traded as John Mills Himself.
