= Vision Brisbane =

- An artist's impression of Vision when completed

General information
- Status: Never built
- Type: Mixed-use
- Architectural style: Modern
- Location: Brisbane, Australia, 222 Margaret St, Brisbane
- Coordinates: 27°28′18.16″S 153°01′43″E
- Construction started: 2007
- Completed: N/A

Height
- Antenna spire: 283 m (928 ft)
- Roof: 259 m (850 ft)
- Top floor: 232 m (761 ft)

Technical details
- Floor count: 72

Design and construction
- Developer: Austcorp

Vision Brisbane (or simply Vision) was a planned 283-metre (928 ft) skyscraper in Brisbane, Australia. The design was 72 storeys high, and would have become Brisbane's tallest, Queensland's second tallest, and Australia's third tallest building if completed. The design was scrapped and replaced by two new buildings, known by the name 111+222.

Vision was planned to be a mixed-use tower with two levels of retail/entertainment space, 13 floors of commercial, 376 residential apartments over 53 floors and a two-storey observation deck on levels 60 and 61 at 205 metres (673 ft). Designed by the Buchan Group and developed by Austcorp, Vision's estimated value on completion was predicted to be A$900 million.

Vision's Plaza was designed to provide a mid-block link between Mary Street and Margaret Street. A total of 7,390 square metres of lettable retail space was to be located within the main tower according to development application lodged with the city council. The public plaza was to include water features and several commissioned works of art.

The 376 apartments within the residential component were planned to consist of 96 four-bedroom, 108 three-bedroom, 52 two-bedroom and 120 single-bedroom units. The commercial space totaled 37,431 square metres, comprising the first 13 levels of the main tower and the associated commercial wing extending towards Mary Street.

== History ==
The development was approved in early December 2006, and on-site construction of the tower commenced in September 2007. The development was due for completion in late 2009 to early 2010. Due to funding issues, and the 2008 financial crisis, the completion of the tower has been put on hold. It is expected that the car park will not be completed until the owners decide whether or not to proceed with the building in its current form, or to begin building in stages as part of the original design.

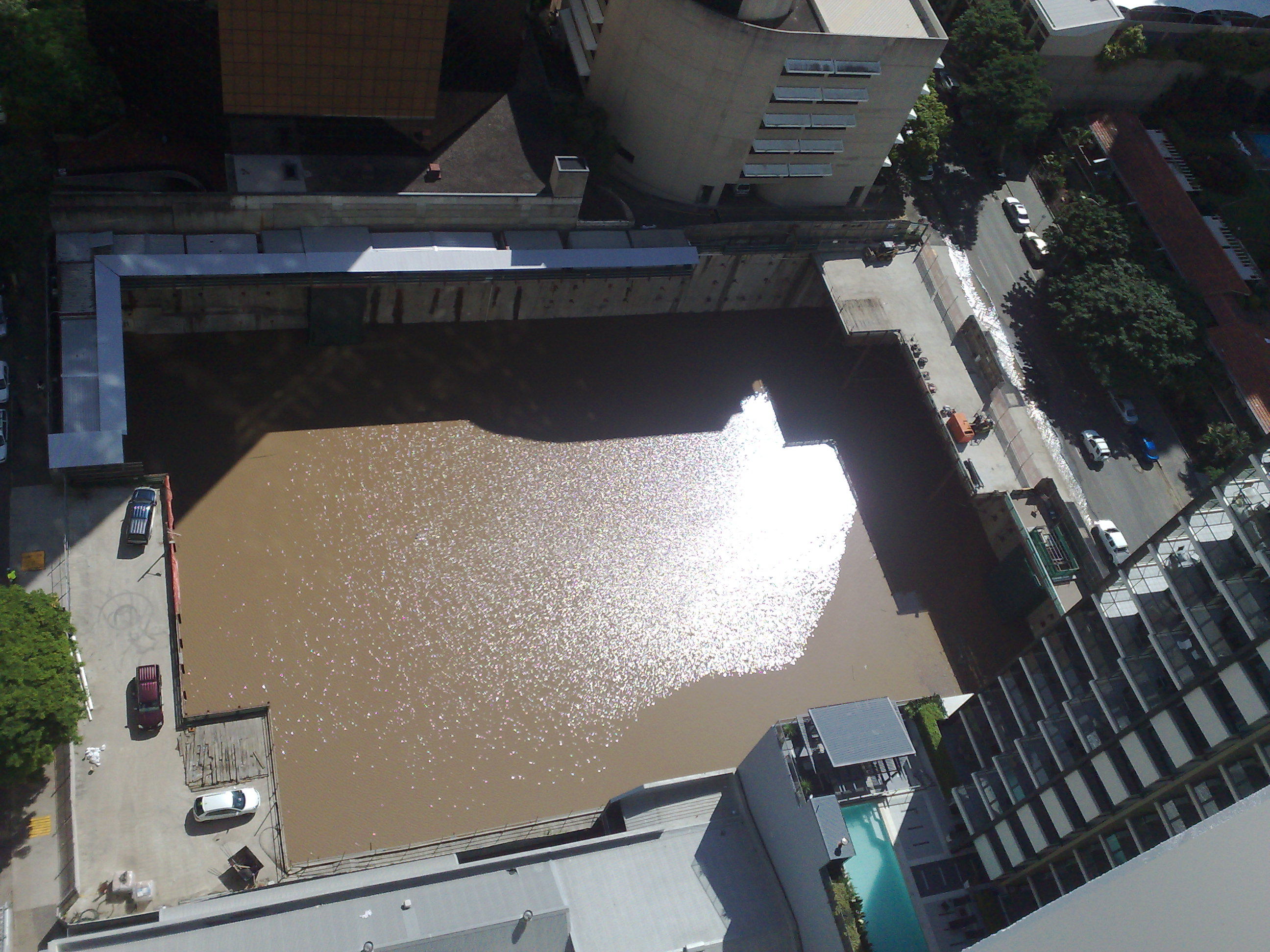
After the flood

Brisbane city Vision Tower project site sold. The site has been bought by Bilbergia who plan to construct a similar building to the original. Following the January 2011 flood in Brisbane, the abandoned seven level hole filled with floodwater, prompting the Brisbane City Council to make inspections. On May 18 two new 297-metre (974 ft) & 160-metre (520 ft) skyscrapers were proposed for the site by the Bilbergia Group and were approved in November 2011.

In November 2014, one of the buildings in 111+222 development–the Brisbane Skytower–which later would be built on the building site, was approved for construction. It was completed in 2019.

== Gallery ==
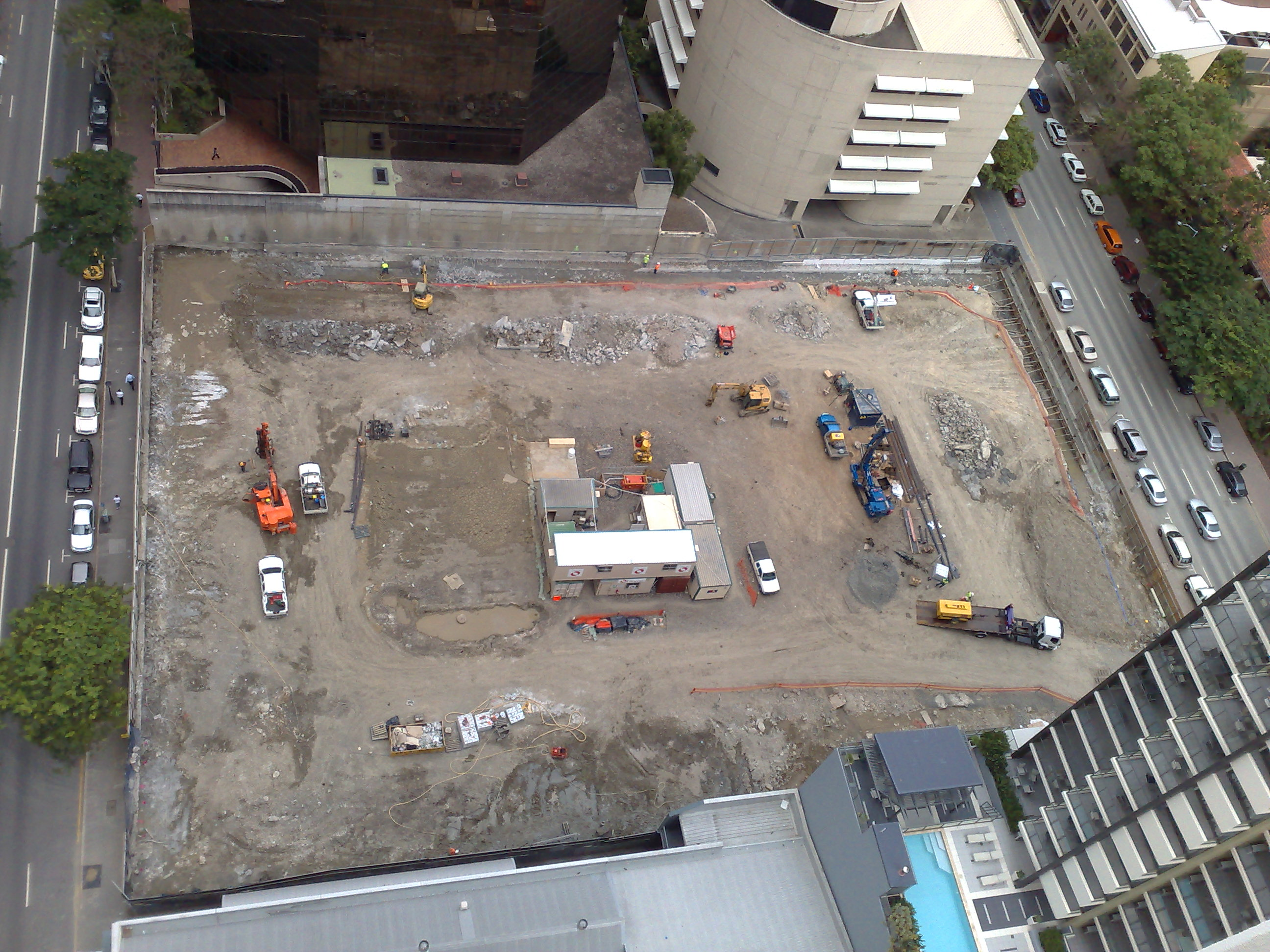
The site on 19 December 2007

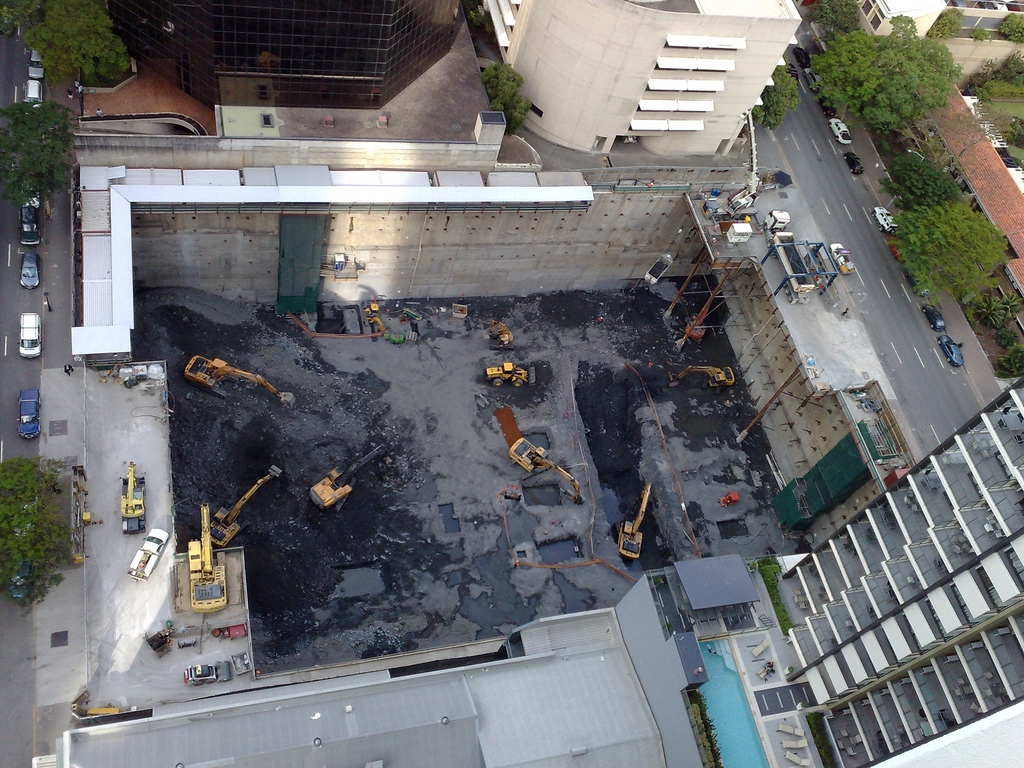
The site on 3 December 2008

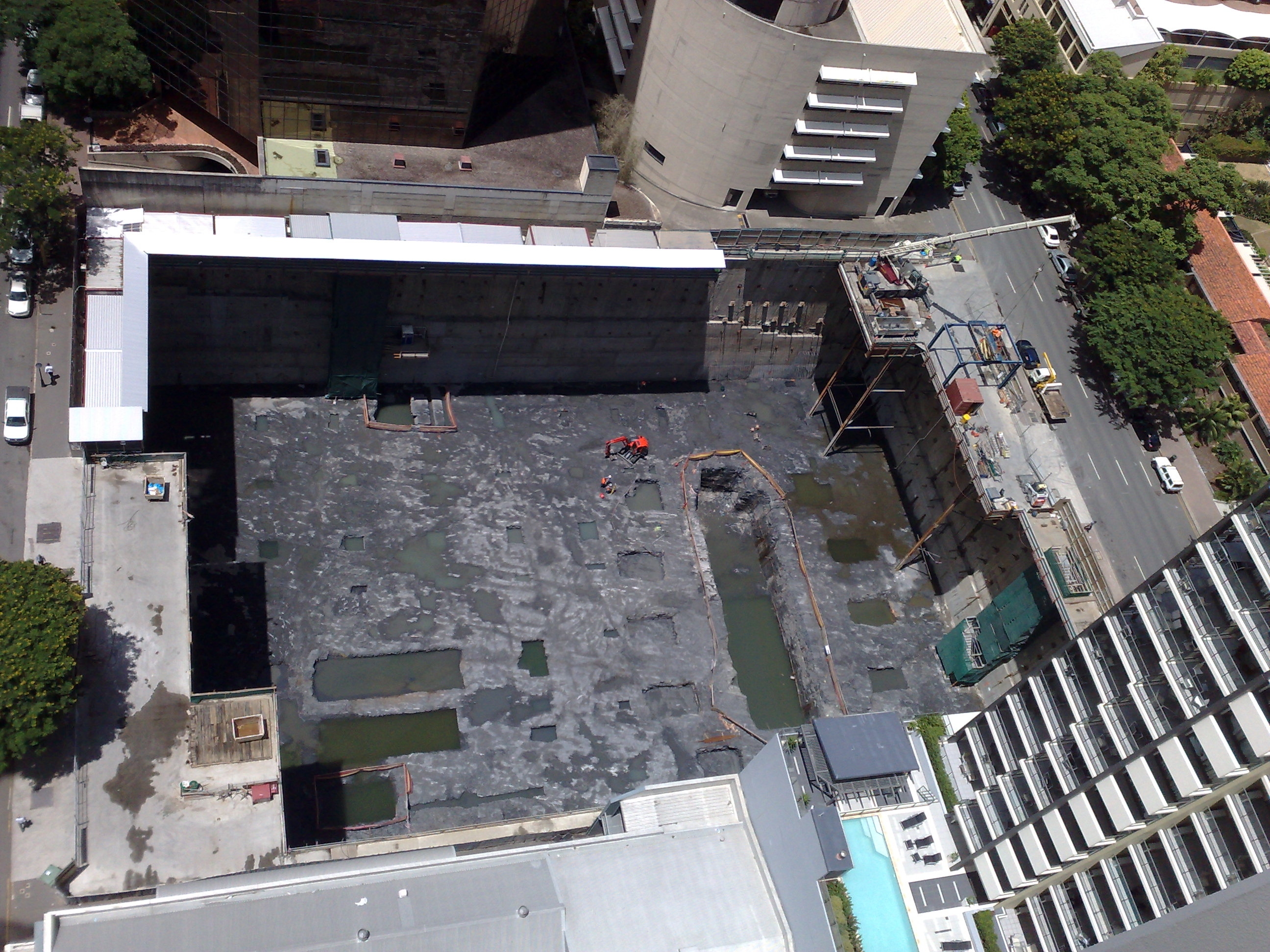
The site on 26 January 2009

== See also ==
- List of tallest buildings in Brisbane
