= Brisbane Festival Hall =

Multi-purpose arena located in the Brisbane, Australia

Coordinates: 27.470779°S 153.026657°E

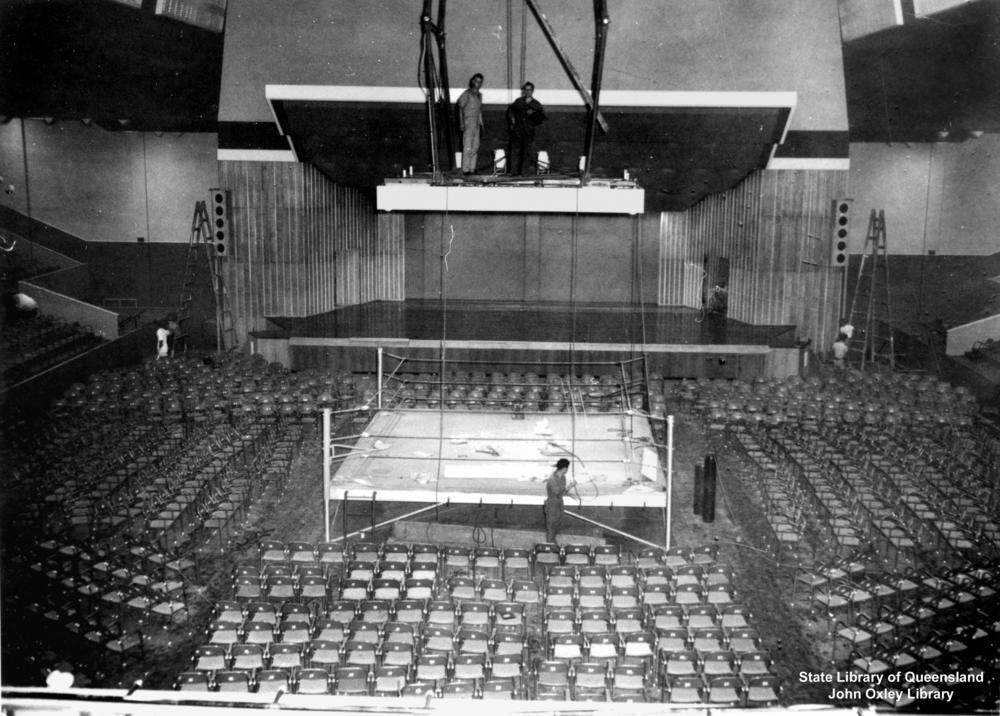
- Interior view of Festival Hall, 1959
- Interactive map of Brisbane Festival Hall
- Address: Charlotte St; Brisbane QLD 4000; Australia
- Owner: Stadiums Limited, City of Brisbane
- Capacity: 4,000
- Type: indoor arena
- Events: music, concerts, sporting events

Construction
- Opened: 27 April 1959
- Closed: 29 August 2003
- Demolished: 2003

Brisbane Festival Hall was an indoor arena located on the southern corner of Albert Street and Charlotte Street, Brisbane, Queensland, Australia. It operated from 1910 to 2003, before being demolished to make the Oak Festival Towers apartment building and hotel.

== History ==
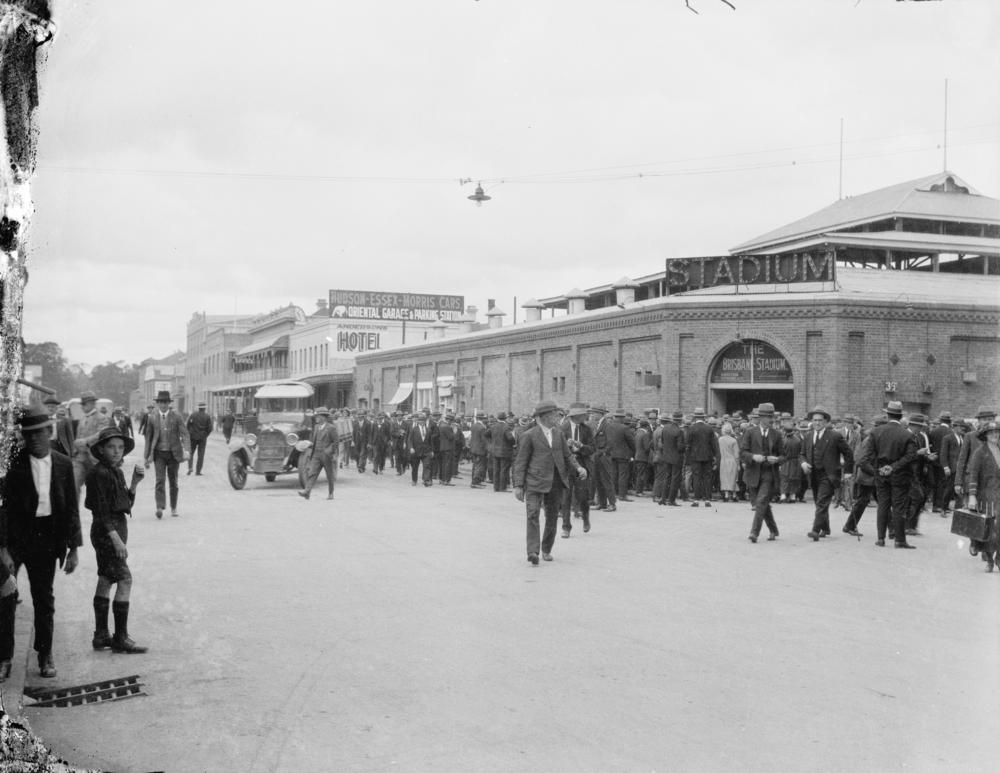
People milling around the entrance of the Brisbane Stadium, circa 1925

The Festival Hall was originally known as Brisbane Stadium, which was built in 1910. In addition to its primary use as a venue to watch boxing, the Brisbane Stadium was also a venue for live concerts. Louis Armstrong, Nat King Cole and Johnnie Ray played there in the 1950s. In 1958, the venue was demolished and a new building constructed, by then leading Queensland Construction Company E.J.Taylor & Sons, as part of the Centenary of Queensland. It was opened on 27 April 1959 and renamed Festival Hall. With a capacity of 4,000 people, it was the largest indoor public venue in the Brisbane inner city area and it remained the city's primary indoor venue for more than forty years. It was designed in a postwar modern style, similar to its namesake, the Royal Festival Hall in London.

== Sports ==
Like similar venues in other Australian cities, Festival Hall originally had been built as a boxing stadium, but as the popularity of boxing and wrestling waned after the introduction of television, it began to be used more often for other forms of entertainment, including the imported American sports craze "Roller Derby", and as a venue for concerts and theatrical presentations. Boxing events for the 1982 Commonwealth Games were held at Festival Hall. Also, many professional boxing events were held at the Festival Hall, including a number headlined by Australian boxing legend Hector Thompson.

== Performances ==
Brisbane Festival Hall hosted performances for virtually every major tour by visiting overseas artists. The Eagles, Pink Floyd, Rick Wakeman, Ike & Tina Turner, The American Globe Trotters, T Rex, Glenn Campbell, Little Richard, Sherbert. On 28 June 1964, The Beatles played the first of four concerts at the venue. Queen played their last concert of the A Night at the Opera Tour on 23 April 1976.

Other performers who entertained at Festival Hall include The Bee Gees, Ray Charles, The Easybeats, The Kinks, The Seekers, Johnny Cash, Bob Dylan, Eric Burdon & The Animals, The Yardbirds, The Who, The Small Faces, Led Zeppelin, Santana, Osibisa, Deep Purple, Black Sabbath, Jethro Tull, Joe Cocker, Alice Cooper, Slade, Fleetwood Mac, AC/DC, Iron Maiden, The Ramones, Bob Marley & the Wailers (18 April 1979), Phil Collins, Gary Numan, The Police, INXS, Madness, The Cure, Public Image Limited, Cheap Trick, Talking Heads, Squeeze, B52s, XTC, Magazine, Elvis Costello, Human League, Psychedelic Furs, Hoodoo Gurus, Nirvana, Ravi Shankar, Jane's Addiction, Sonic Youth, Pantera, U2, Red Hot Chili Peppers, Tool, Ozzy Osbourne, Lemonheads, Faith No More, Posies, You Am I, Powderfinger, Moby, Groove Armada, Stone Roses, Björk, Sex Pistols, The Prodigy, Nick Cave & The Bad Seeds, Public Enemy, Regurgitator, Portishead, Massive Attack, Radiohead, Beck, The Chemical Brothers, Blondie.

Some early performances were done by the Czech Philharmonic Orchestra and the Bolshoi Ballet. The Police were scheduled to perform during The Police Around the World Tour on 24 March 1980, but the show was cancelled. The final concert held there, Michael Franti and Spearhead, took place on 9 August 2003.

== Redevelopment ==
Brisbane Festival Hall closed on 29 August 2003, and the building was subsequently sold and demolished to make way for an apartment development known as Festival Towers. The seats from the venue were sold off as souvenirs in lots of three.

== Legacy ==
Devine Limited, developers of the Festival Towers apartment building, subsequently commissioned the Queensland Performing Arts Centre's Performing Arts Museum to design and install a "Walk of Fame" display commemorating the history of the site. Located within the entry lobby of Festival Towers, the display consists of a wall-mounted installation of backlit panels, incorporating original seatbacks from Festival Hall, with images of performers and other significant figures in the Festival Hall story. Other smaller panels feature photographs and history of the site.

== See also ==
- History of Brisbane
