= 123 Albert Street =

Skyscraper in Brisbane, Queensland

- Interactive map of the 123 Albert Street area

General information
- Status: Opened
- Type: Commercial office
- Location: Brisbane, Queensland (Australia)
- Coordinates: 27°28′14.71″S 153°01′36.26″E
- Construction started: February 2008
- Completed: July 2011
- Opened: October 2011
- Cost: $359 million
- Owner: Dexus

Height
- Roof: 127 m (417 ft)

Technical details
- Floor count: 31
- Floor area: 38,991 m²

Design and construction
- Architect: Hassell
- Developer: Dexus
- Structural engineer: Robert Bird
- Main contractor: Laing O'Rourke

123 Albert Street is a commercial office development in Brisbane, Australia. The modern style office building is located in the Brisbane central business district at 123 Albert Street. The building was completed in July 2011 and opened in October 2011.

The Premium grade office tower was designed by Hassell and is owned by Dexus. The tower consists of 26 levels of office space and eight levels of car parking (five above ground) which provide 388 car park spaces. The building has a two design ratings: a 6 Green Star rating and a 5 Star Australian Building Greenhouse Rating which are pending assessment.

On 25 August 2010 a worker was injured during the construction of the tower.

The building was the first in Brisbane to employ a commercial concierge.

== See also ==
- List of tallest buildings in Brisbane
