= Brisbane Polo Club =

Defunct polo club in Brisbane, Queensland

The Brisbane Polo & Equestrian Club was a polo club in Brisbane central business district, Australia. It was the oldest polo club in the country.

== Location ==
The club was housed in the heritage listed Naldham House, located in the city-centre suburb of Brisbane central business district.

== History ==
The Brisbane Polo Club was established in 1990. The club was in financial difficulty by 2015 and, when approached in the same year with an unsolicited offer for its premises, the members voted to sell the premises and wind up the club itself.

A subsequent planning application was submitted in November 2016 to re-purpose Naldham House, which will involve an extensive internal refurbishment, and minor external changes to improve accessibility.
