= Mary Street, Brisbane =

Street in Brisbane, Queensland

Coordinates: 27°28′16.36″S 153°01′42.22″E

Mary Street Queensland
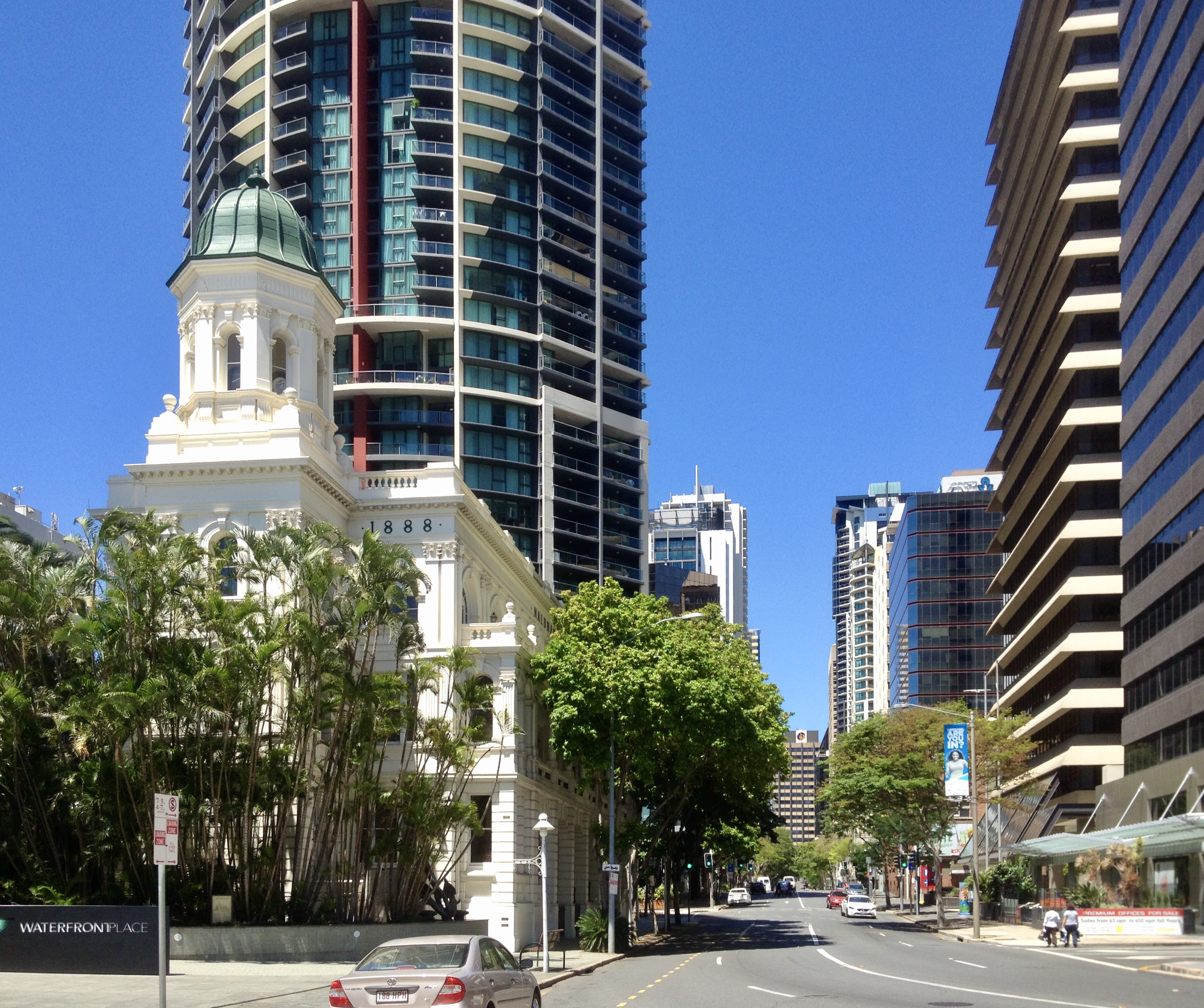
- Mary Street with Naldham House on the left.

General information
- Type: Street
- Location: Brisbane

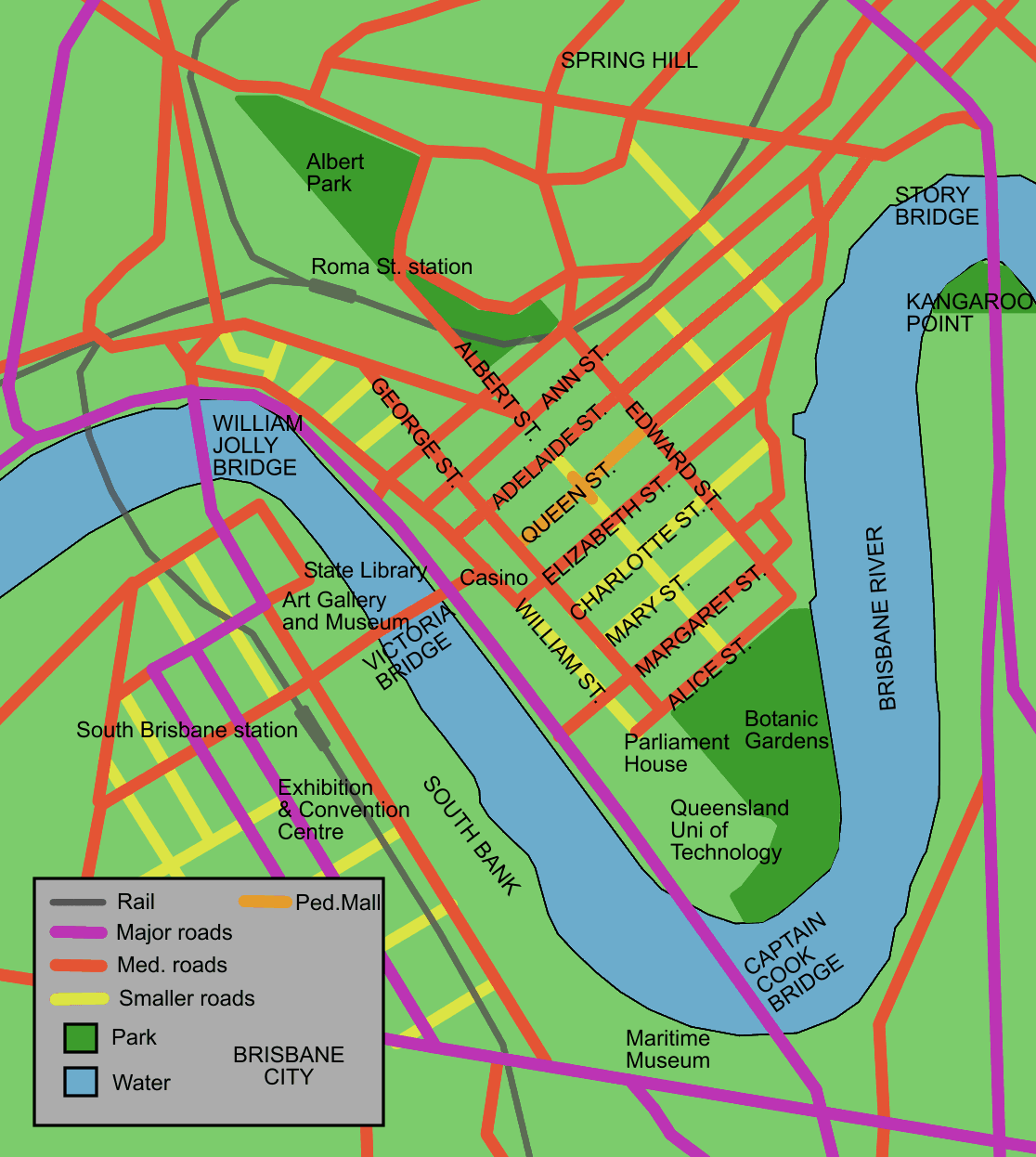
Map of Brisbane City streets

Mary Street is a major road in the Brisbane central business district. The street is one of a number that were named after female queens and princesses of the royal family shortly after the penal colony was settled. Charlotte Street is positioned parallel to the north and Margaret Street runs next to the south.

Mary Street begins in the Government Precinct at a T-intersection with George Street opposite Queen's Wharf. Also at the elevated southern end is Education House containing state government offices and the Department of Mines and Energy, Queensland are located opposite in the Queensland Minerals & Energy Centre. Felix Tower is located on the corner of Mary and Felix Streets. Waterfront Place and Midtown Centre (formerly the Health and Forestry House) are nearby in the lower northern section, close to the river.

Vision Brisbane was a planned residential skyscraper on Mary Street that would have been Brisbane's tallest building.

Mary Street was home to the first premises used by the Queensland Club, before moving to the corner of George Street and Alice Street.

In September 2022, the Mary Street Vision was released by the state government. The planning document is set to transform the street into a subtropical commuter and tourism link. It involves wider footpaths, extra street trees and more small eateries.

== Heritage listings ==
A number of buildings in Mary Street are heritage-listed:

- 130–132 Mary Street (Mooneys Building), a warehouse built in 1883 for William Mooney, a Brisbane wholesale and retail tobacconist
- 138 Mary Street, a wine and spirits storehouse built in about 1901 for Perkins Brewery (now Castlemaine Perkins)
- 169 Mary Street, a warehouse built in 1887–1888 for Queensland pastoralists and politicians William Allan, MLA and William Graham, MLC
- 193 Mary Street (Naldham House), a shipping office built initially in 1864 but substantially rebuilt in 1889 for the Australian United Steam Navigation Company

== Major intersections ==
- George Street
- Albert Street
- Edward Street
- Market Street

== See also ==
- Adelaide Street
- Ann Street
- Elizabeth Street
- Queen Street
