= Festival Towers =

Skyscraper in Brisbane, Queensland

- View of Festival Tower from the Royal Albert Hotel
- Interactive map of the Festival Towers area

General information
- Status: Completed
- Type: Residential
- Location: Brisbane, Queensland, Australia
- Coordinates: 27.471534°S 153.0266118°E
- Construction started: January 2004
- Completed: August 2006
- Opening: 2006
- Operator: The Oaks Group

Height
- Roof: 135 m (443 ft)

Technical details
- Floor count: 41

Website
- festivaltowers.com.au

Festival Towers is a residential skyscraper located in Brisbane, Australia. It is situated on the corner of Albert and Charlotte streets. The tower has a modern green facade with a vivid architectural stance.

Festival Tower consists of 41 floors of 401 apartments ranging from one to three bedrooms. The tower also contains a podium level for residents and guests equipped with a pool, a spa, lawn and a dining area. The cost of construction was $162 million.

The tower is located on the site where Brisbane Festival Hall once stood, and the many images in the foyer pay homage to artists who played there.

In 2007, under the managements of the Oaks Group, the majority of rental leases were converted to short-term accommodation stays, effectively forcing out hundreds of residents and converting the building into a hotel. Subsequently, the building became a mix of owner-occupiers, corporate guests and permanent rentals.

== See also ==
- List of skyscrapers in Brisbane
