= Naldham House =

Heritage-listed building in Brisbane, Queensland

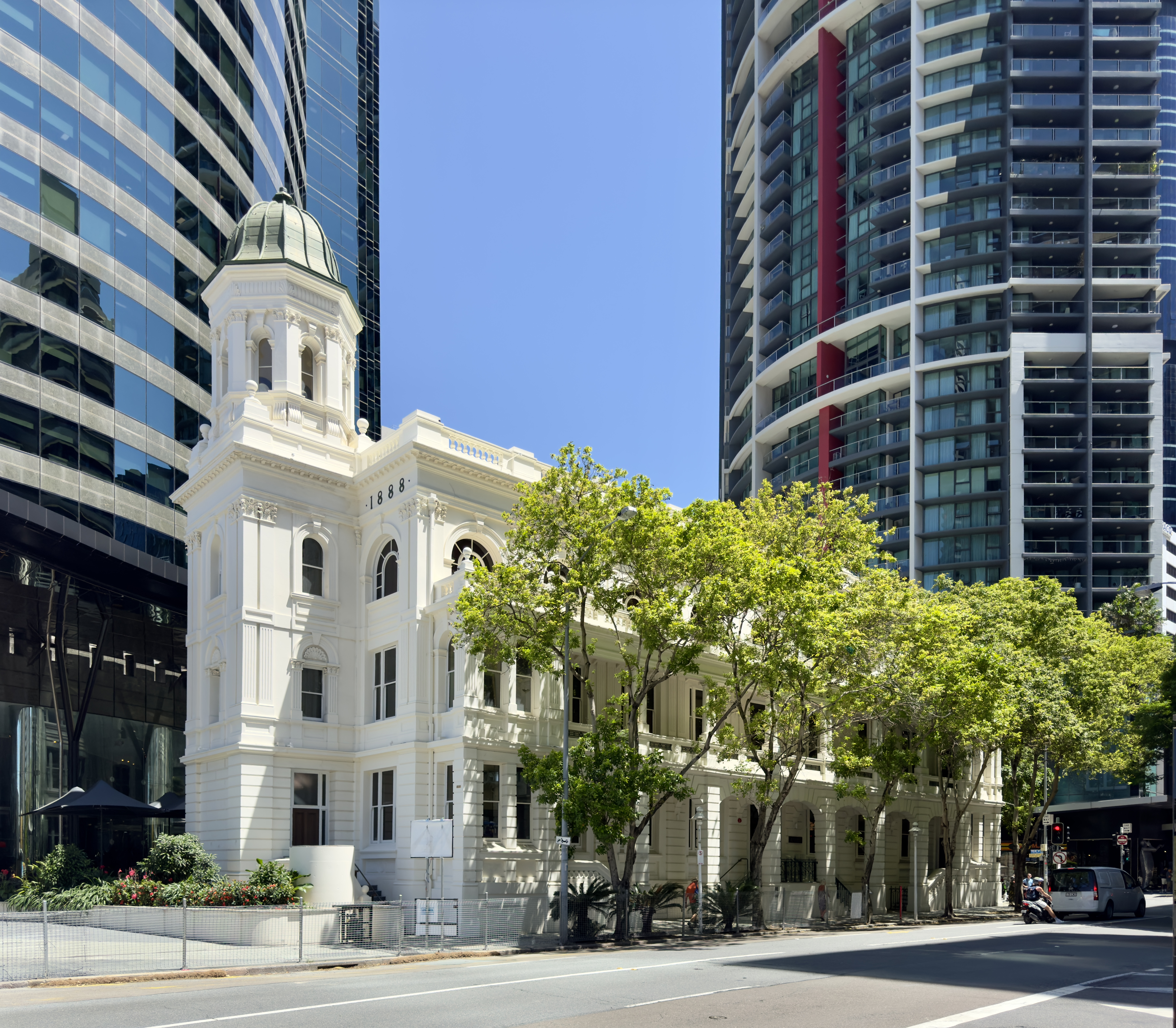
- Naldham House, 2024

- Location within Queensland
- 27.4701°S 153.0301°E
- Location: 193 Mary Street, Brisbane City, City of Brisbane, Queensland, Australia

History
- Design period: 1840s–1860s (mid-19th century)
- Built: 1864–1889

Site notes
- Architectural style: Classicism
- Website: naldhamhouse.com.au

Queensland Heritage Register
- Official name: Naldham House, AUSN House
- Type: state heritage (built)
- Designated: 21 October 1992
- Reference no.: 600133
- Significant period: 1864–1889 (fabric); 1864–1886 (historical)
- Significant components: tower

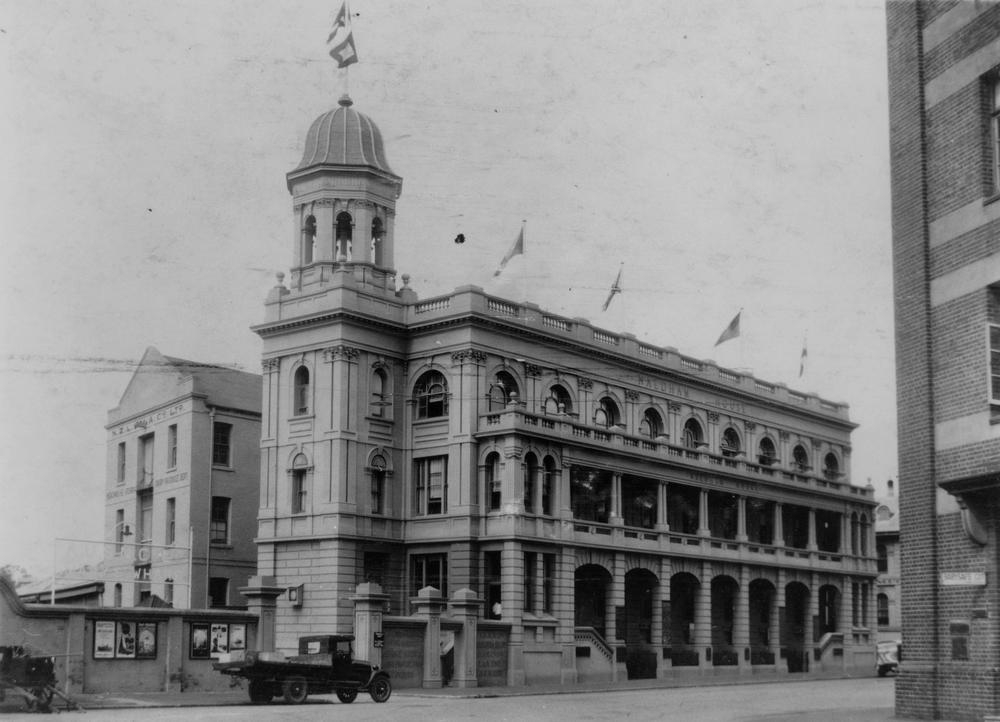
Naldham House, premises of the Australian United Steam Navigation Company, Mary Street, Brisbane, c. 1935

Naldham House is a heritage-listed multi-level dining venue, located at 33 Felix Street, Brisbane, Australia. It was built from 1864 to 1889. It is also known as AUSN House. It was added to the Queensland Heritage Register on 21 October 1992.

In July 2024, Naldham House reopened to the public as a multi-level dining venue after an extensive refurbishment by DEXUS and DAP and Co. Hospitality.

== History ==
The building was built initially in 1864, extended in the late 1870s, but substantially rebuilt in 1889 for the Australian United Steam Navigation Company. It served for almost a century as a shipping office. In 1988 major external and internal alternations were carried out in converting the building into premises for a club.

The site, adjacent to the Brisbane River, was acquired by the Australasian Steam Navigation Company (ASN) in March 1852 although the company did not construct wharves until 1859 the company's first wharf had been erected on the new site followed by a second wharf near Eagle Street in 1861.

In 1864 a two-storeyed office was erected and occupied by Henry O'Reilly, the ASN's Brisbane agent. This building was situated on the northern (tower) end of the present Naldham House. In 1877 the ASN's Brisbane office was elevated from agency to branch status, and at some time between 1875 and 1878 the office building was extended to the Felix Street corner.

In the mid 1880s the ASN was taken over and amalgamated with several other shipping companies to form the Australasian United Steam Navigation Company (AUSN) which became a dominant force in Queensland and Australian shipping.

In August 1888 architects McCredie Bros & Chambers called tenders for the extension of the Felix Street offices of the AUSN. The successful tenderer was J R Locke of Redfern, Sydney. At a cost of £11,000 the upper storey was demolished and two new floors were added, a tower and cupola built into the northern end, a balcony included in the Mary Street side and new entrances formed.

In 1914, MacDonald Hamilton & Co became agents for AUSN and instigated internal renovations (c. 1915–20), including silky oak panelling on the first floor. They were also responsible for the change of the name to Naldham House which was the firm's telex address, derived from the middle letters of their name (MacDoNALD+HAMilton). This firm was an agent for a number of shipping, insurance and trading companies, including the Australasian United Steam Navigation Company.

MacDonald Hamilton & Co managed AUSN activities until the winding up of the AUSN in 1960. They carried out further internal renovations and a new entrance to Mary Street was constructed. The firm remained in the building until 1986.

In 1988–1989 major alterations and additions were undertaken as part of the incorporation of the building in the new riverside development, Waterfront Place. This work included the demolition of the adjacent bond store and the replicates details of the Mary Street facade on the previously blank eastern wall, which has now become the main entrance facade.

In 1994, Naldham House was purchased for $3.2 million by the Brisbane Polo Club, who operated the building as a private club and conference centre. In May 2015, the club was facing debts and decided to wind up, after accepting an unsolicited offer of $10 million from Singapore developer and hotelier Koh Wee Meng.

In January 2016, Dexus Property Group (owners of Waterfront Place) purchased Naldham House for $14 million as a strategic acquisition, describing it as "the front door of the Waterfront Place precinct".

== Description ==
Naldham House, located on the corner of Mary and Felix Street, is a three storeyed rendered brick building with basement. The building forms a thin rectangle in plan form with the tower being located at the river end. Redevelopment of the adjacent site has now removed the visual link with the river.

The principal facade is to Mary Street and contains a colonnade on the ground and first floors. The detailing on the facade is a free adaptation of classical detailing, with ascending orders on succeeding levels.

On the first floor there are paired fluted pilasters without capitals. The colonnade at this level has paired columns with stylised Ionic capitals. The window openings on the second floor are large and have semi-circular arched heads. Between these openings are paired pilasters with one large Corinthian capital that extends across the top of both. Above the capitals is a plain frieze, a cornice and a parapet composed of Italianate balusters. The narrow northern facade has the date "1888" on the upper frieze.

The most distinctive feature of the building is the octagonal tower with cupola at the river end. The cupola, tower end and street facades of the building are intact.

The eastern facade, which now contains the main entrance, incorporates classical detail. The date "1988" appears below the cornice. The building has been refurbished internally. The interior including a new staircase was constructed in the manner of a late nineteenth century colonial club.

== Heritage listing ==
Naldham House was listed on the Queensland Heritage Register on 21 October 1992 having satisfied the following criteria.

The place is important in demonstrating the evolution or pattern of Queensland's history.

Naldham House provides evidence of major shipping activity along the town reach and of the former prominence of the Australian United Steam Navigation Company in Queensland's maritime industry

The place is important in demonstrating the principal characteristics of a particular class of cultural places.

The building is a fine example of a late nineteenth century maritime building with an imposing architectural presence.

The place is important because of its aesthetic significance.

The building is a fine example of a late nineteenth century maritime building with an imposing architectural presence. Naldham House is significant as a remnant of a former streetscape of opulent mercantile buildings.
