= Ian Evans (historian) =

Australian author, publisher and historian

Ian Joseph Evans OAM (born Parkes, New South Wales, 1940) is an Australian author, publisher and historian. Evans discovered the use of deliberately concealed objects to protect Australian houses and other buildings from evil spiritual forces in the period 1788-1935. The author of books on the history and conservation of old Australian houses, Evans contributed to the growth of the heritage movement that spread throughout Australia in the 1980s. His first book, Restoring Old Houses (MacMillan, 1979) is credited with having stimulated the movement. Other books followed, including several published by Evans's family publishing house, The Flannel Flower Press Pty Ltd.

== Life and career ==
Evans has encouraged the conservation of Australia's architectural heritage. Since 1979, he has produced a substantial body of work on this subject. In writing his books, he has worked with Government authorities including the NSW Department of Planning, the Queensland Museum and the National Trust. In 1988, he was appointed a Trustee of the Historic Houses Trust of New South Wales.

In 1989, Evans acquired and restored the John Mills' residence at 107 Kadumba Street, Yeronga in Brisbane. It was added to the Queensland Heritage Register on 25 August 2000.

Evans's contribution to heritage conservation has facilitated the widespread use of traditional colours on old buildings throughout Australia – a trend which followed the publication of his book Colour Schemes for Old Australian Houses, written in association with the conservation architects Clive Lucas and Ian Stapleton. Local Government authorities and heritage bodies use this book and a companion volume, More Colour Schemes for Old Australian Houses, as the source of traditional colour schemes for houses and other buildings in conservation areas. These books brought traditional exterior colours back into fashion and changed the face of inner-city suburbs in cities throughout Australia.

Evans sought to empower the owners of old houses by providing them with information previously available only to conservation architects and professionals. He argued that the greater part of our built heritage is privately owned and that making authoritative information widely accessible would foster grassroots interest in Australia's heritage of old buildings.

Evans has been involved in campaigns to save individual buildings including the John Verge–designed Lyndhurst at Glebe, which was for a time the headquarters of the Historic Houses Trust of New South Wales. His efforts to stop the destruction of the traditional timber houses of Brisbane received publicity, in The Australian newspaper and on The 7.30 Report in Brisbane and Sydney. Brisbane City Council subsequently enacted planning measures to impede the removal of the timber buildings which are largely responsible for the character of the city.

Between 2002 and 2005, Evans served as architectural historian to the Troodos Archaeological and Environmental Survey Project and prepared a report on traditional buildings in the Troodos Mountains of Cyprus for the Department of Archeology at the University of Glasgow.

In 2010, Evans received a PhD from the University of Newcastle for his thesis on this topic. Entitled "Touching Magic: Deliberately Concealed Objects in old Australian Houses and Buildings".

From 2017-2019, Evans conducted the Tasmanian Magic Project, looking for apotropaic marks like hexafoils and burn marks at numerous historic properties in Tasmania's Midlands and in the Western Districts of Victoria Southern Midlands.

Evans was educated at Catholic and State schools in Parkes before moving to Sydney in 1959; copy boy and cadet journalist at Mirror Newspapers 1959–61; journalist at ATN7 News 1961–72; PR consultant 1972–79; author, publisher, heritage consultant 1979–present. He was awarded the Medal of the Order of Australia in 2005 for service to the preservation of the architectural heritage of Australia and a PhD from the University of Newcastle in 2010.

== Awards ==
| National Trust of Australia (NSW) | Australian Heritage Awards 2001 | The Queensland House – History and Conservation |
| National Trust (Qld) | John Herbert Award 1998 | World of Old Houses internet site |
| National Trust (Qld) | John Herbert Award 1996 | Body of work on Australia's architectural heritage |
| National Trust of Australia (NSW) | Australian Heritage Awards 1995 | The Federation House – A Restoration Guide |
| National Trust of Australia (NSW) | Australian Heritage Awards 1989 | Caring for Old Houses |

== Publications ==
- Evans, Ian (2016). "The Absence of the Document: Discovering Concealed Magic in the Antipodes". In Professor Ronald Hutton (ed.). Physical Evidence for Ritual Acts, Sorcery and Witchcraft in Christian Britain. Basingstoke, Hampshire: Palgrave Macmillan. ISBN 978-1-137-44481-3.
- Evans, Ian; National Trust of Queensland (2001). The Queensland House: history and conservation. Flannel Flower Press. ISBN 978-1-875253-12-8.
- Evans, Ian with various authors (1994). Fisher, Rod; Crozier, Brian Alington (eds.). The Queensland House: a roof over our heads. Queensland Museum. ISBN 978-0-7242-5711-9.
- Evans, Ian; Lucas, Clive; Stapleton, Ian (1992). More Colour Schemes for Old Australian Houses. Flannel Flower Press. ISBN 978-1-875253-04-3.
- Evans, Ian (1990). The Complete Australian Old House Catalogue: where to get absolutely everything to restore an old building. The Flannel Flower Press. ISBN 978-1-875253-01-2.
- Evans, Ian (1989). Getting the Details Right: restoring Australian houses 1890s-1920s. Flannel Flower Press. ISBN 978-1-875253-00-5.
- Evans, Ian; McCowage, Michael (1988). Caring for Old Houses. Sydney Flannel Flower Press. ISBN 978-0-9594923-8-5.
- Evans, Ian (1986). The Federation House: a restoration guide. Sydney Flannel Flower Press. ISBN 978-0-9594923-5-4.
- Evans, Ian (1984). The Australian Old House Catalogue: the complete "where to get it" guide for the home restorer. Methuen Haynes. ISBN 978-0-454-00635-3.
- Evans, Ian; Lucas, Clive; Stapleton, Ian (2004). Colour Schemes for Old Australian Houses. Flannel Flower Press. ISBN 978-0-9594923-3-0.
- Evans, Ian (1983). Furnishing Old Houses: a guide to interior restoration. Macmillan. ISBN 978-0-333-35635-7.
- Evans, Ian; McArdell, Pat; Townsend, Alan; Evans, Ian (1983). The Australian Home. Glebe, N.S.W.: The Flannel Flower Press. ISBN 978-0-9594923-6-1.
- Evans, Ian; Townsend, Alan (photographer) (1981). The Lithgow Pottery. Sydney, NSW The Flannel Flower Press. ISBN 978-0-9594923-0-9.
- Evans, Ian (1979). Restoring Old Houses. Macmillan. ISBN 978-0-333-29881-7.
- Evans, Ian (1981). The Lithgow Pottery. The Flannel Flower Press. ISBN 0959492305
- Evans, Ian (1978). "John Verge (1782–1861)". In Broadbent, James; Dupain, Max (eds.). The Golden Decade of Australian Architecture: the work of John Verge. David Ell Press in association with the Elizabeth Bay House Trust. ISBN 978-0-908197-00-2.
