= John Mills Himself Building =

Heritage-listed building in Brisbane, Queensland

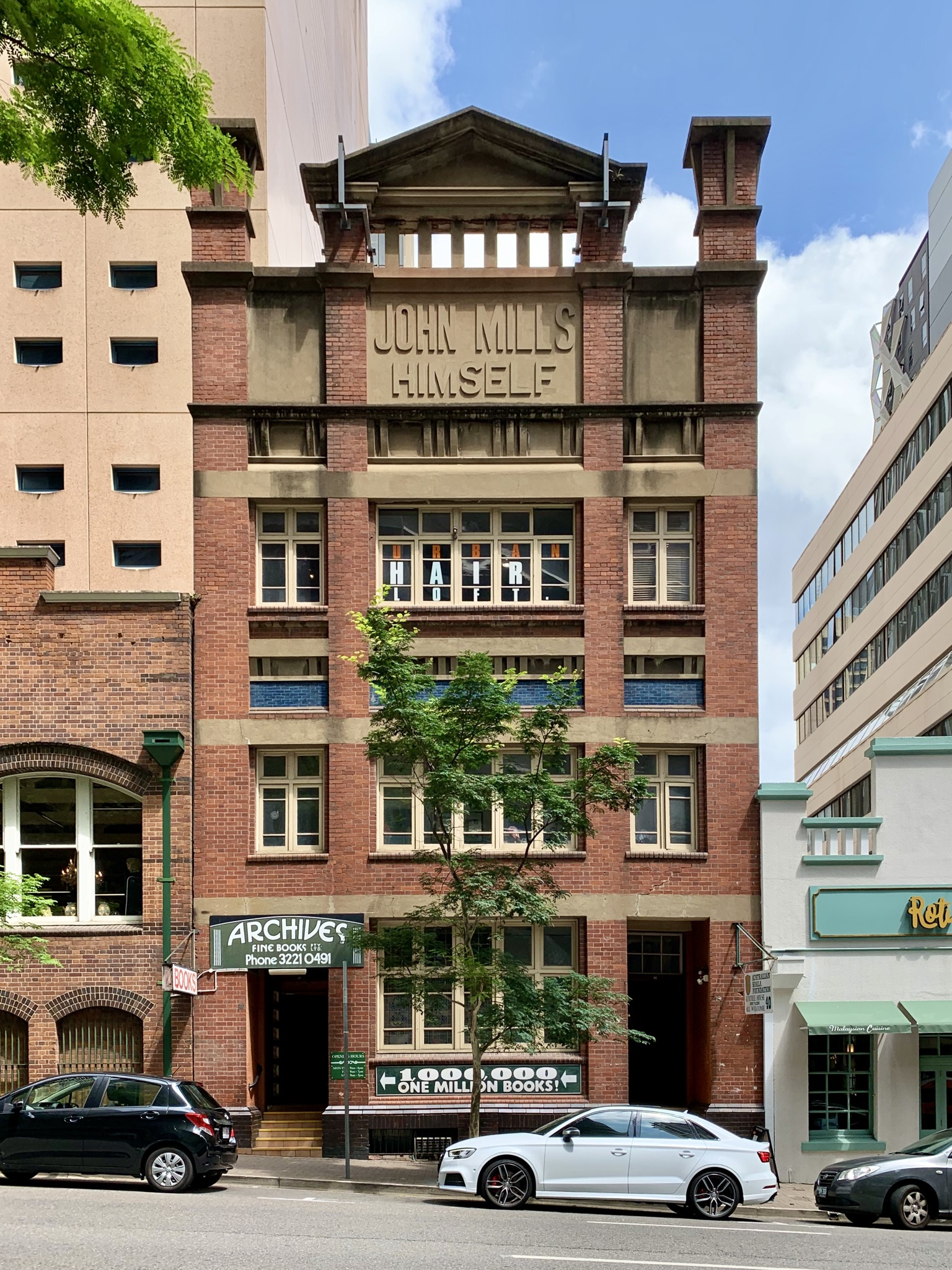
- John Mills Himself Building, 2020

- Location within Queensland Location within Australia
- 27.4717°S 153.0256°E
- Location: 40 Charlotte Street, Brisbane City, City of Brisbane, Queensland, Australia

History
- Design period: 1914–1919 (World War I)
- Built: 1919

Queensland Heritage Register
- Official name: John Mills Himself Building
- Type: state heritage (built)
- Designated: 21 October 1992
- Reference no.: 600084
- Significant period: 1919 (fabric); 1919–1980s (historical)
- Significant components: crane / gantry, loading bay/dock

John Mills Himself Building is a heritage-listed warehouse at 40 Charlotte Street, Brisbane City, City of Brisbane, Queensland, Australia. It was built in 1919. It was added to the Queensland Heritage Register on 21 October 1992.

== History ==
The confidence and optimism caused by Queensland's economic prosperity between 1908 and 1914, found its expression in the redevelopment of inner city areas like Charlotte Street where light industry workshops replaced timber residential and business premises. Small industrial businesses, such as John Reid and Nephews (engineers), George Weston (metal merchants) and John Mills (printer) built their premises in Charlotte Street on the fringe of the commercial centre, in 1912–13, 1915 and 1918, respectively.

In July 1918 this site was purchased by John Charles Mills. Mills traded as Mills and Green, printers and stationers from 1907 to 1908 in Adelaide Street, but on dissolution of the partnership, he traded alone, under the name John Mills Himself. During World War I his business expanded and he established a large warehouse at Newstead. In 1919 he moved to Charlotte Street and constructed his office, printery workshop and warehouse on this site previously occupied by Markwell's cottage. By the 1920s the business was well established, attracting clients such as Steele Rudd. Mills leased the remainder of the building to related businesses, including the Gresham Publishing Company Ltd from 1920 to 1933 and the Press Etching Company, blockmakers and process engravers from 1921 to 1941. Other rooms were leased to clothing manufacturers, mapmakers, watchmakers and lantern slide makers.

After John Mills' death in 1934, his business was continued by his sons, John and Sam Mills. During World War II part of the building was used as a gymnasium for the National Fitness Movement. In recent years it has been occupied by a variety of tenants associated with the arts. The property remained in the Mills family until the 1980s.

== Description ==
John Mills Himself is the tallest of a group of brick buildings in Charlotte Street extending from the Pancake Manor (St Luke's Church of England, Brisbane) to George Weston and Sons. It consists of two buildings connected by an open timber stairway. The portion fronting Charlotte Street is three storeys high with a face brick and render street elevation and a tall decorative parapet. The ground floor has an entry to either side of a central window with a plinth of darker brick. The window sills are the same dark brick. The remainder of the facade is divided by brick pilasters into a large central bay flanked by narrow bays. Between the first and second floor is a horizontal band of blue ceramic tiles broken only by the pilasters. The end brick pilasters continue through the parapet to become tall freestanding columns, while the central two support a triangular classical pediment. Below the pediment in the tall parapet are the words "John Mills Himself" picked out in raised rendered lettering. The timber doors and windows on the facade are original.

The upper portion of the side walls extend in a tall flowing double curve to support the parapet. Behind the front section the building is only two storeys high. The top level has natural light from a central clerestory. Under the clerestory internally some roof trusses are partially exposed. The ceiling is timber boarding. Modern office partitioning has been added to the internal spaces in the three-storey section of the building.

At the rear is a separate building facing a laneway from Elizabeth Street. This is two storeys above a basement and has two loading bays centrally on its rear facade. A projecting gantry is located centrally in the end gable. The basement runs the length of both buildings. This building has an exposed structure with large scale timber beams and columns, timber joists separated by herring-bone strutting and exposed timber trusses.

== Heritage listing ==
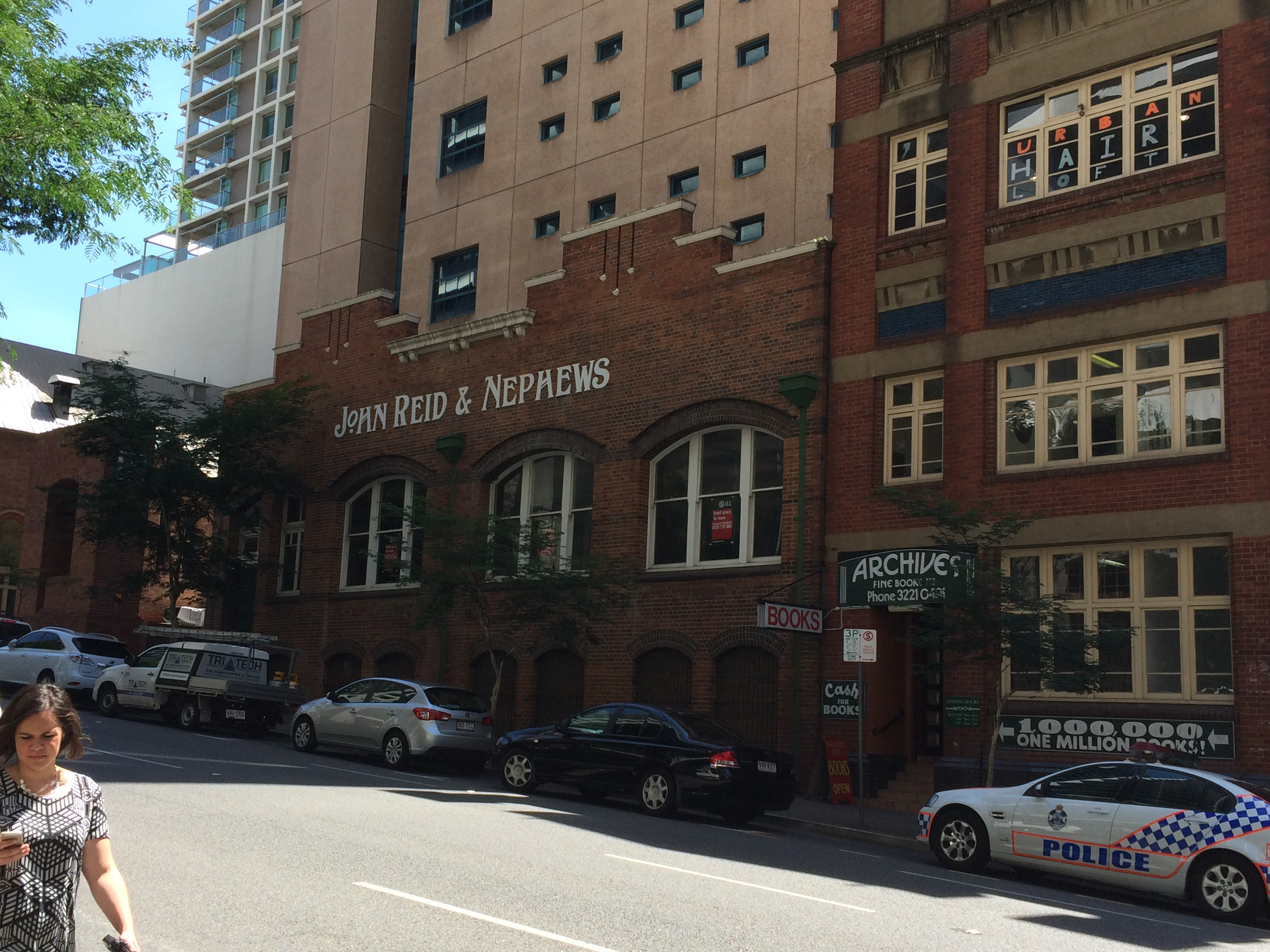
John Reid & Nephews Building facade with John Mills Himself building to the right, 2015

John Mills Himself Building was listed on the Queensland Heritage Register on 21 October 1992 having satisfied the following criteria.

The place is important in demonstrating the evolution or pattern of Queensland's history.

John Mills Himself Building is significant as an example of the redevelopment of Charlotte Street in the early twentieth century as a light industrial precinct.

The place is important because of its aesthetic significance.

John Mills Himself Building is significant for the contribution the scale, texture and form of the building makes to the streetscape. John Mills Himself Building provides a visual complement to other brick buildings nearby including George Weston and Sons Workshop, John Reid and Nephews Building facade and the former St Luke's Church of England (now The Pancake Manor).

== See also ==
- John Mills' residence — John Mills' residence in Yeronga is also heritage-listed
