= Albert Street, Brisbane =

Street in Brisbane, Queensland

Albert Street Queensland
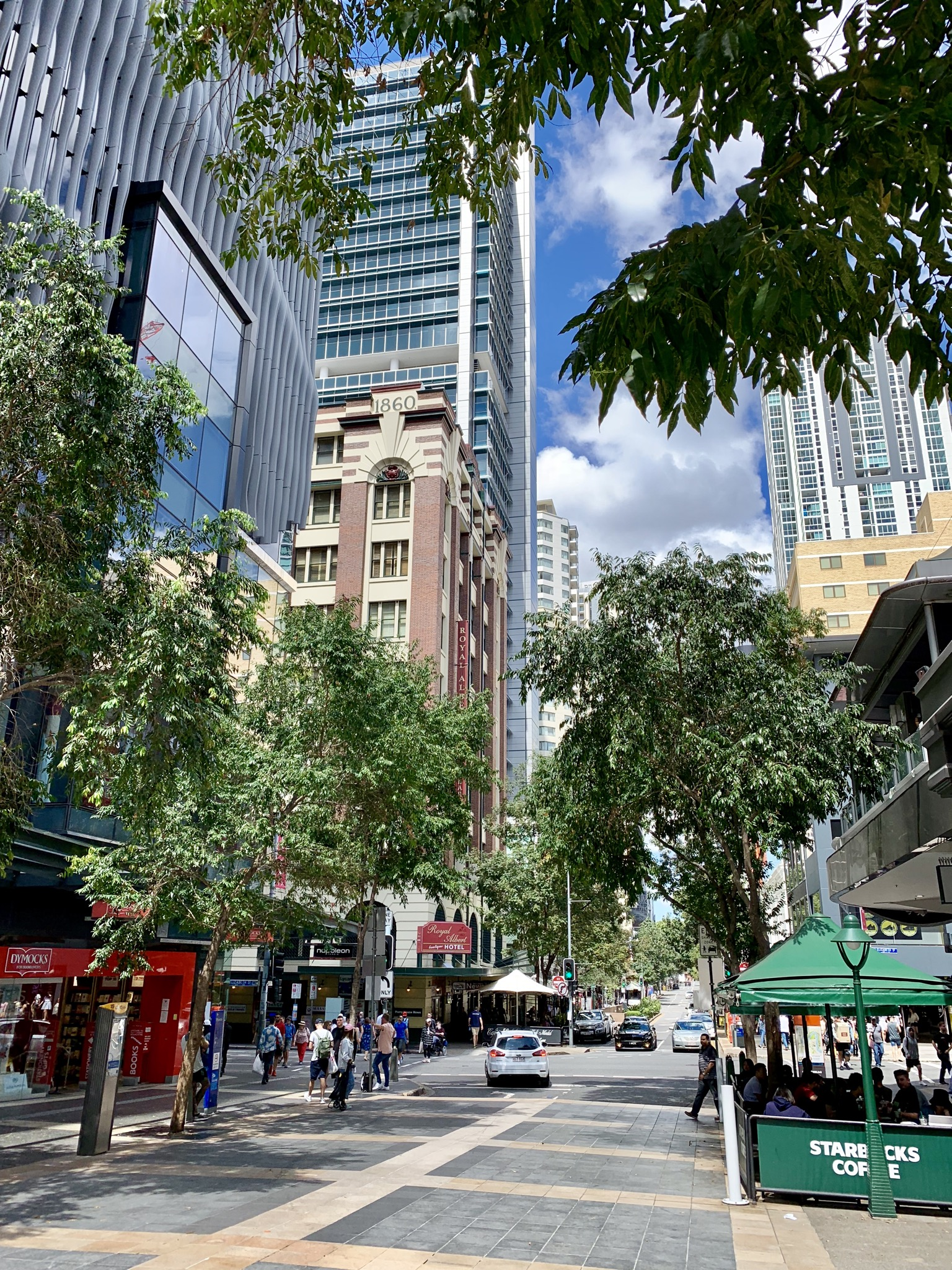
- Albert Street
- Coordinates: 27.469107°S 153.024632°E

General information
- Type: Street
- Location: Brisbane

Albert Street is a street in the central business district of Brisbane, Queensland, Australia. It was named after Prince Albert, the Prince Consort of Queen Victoria of the United Kingdom. Albert Street railway station is being built directly beneath the street and will open as part of the Cross River Rail project. The station precinct includes partial road closures as planned in the 2014 City Centre Master Plan, and will contribute to the creation of a new public space.

== Geography ==
The street forms a key city axis. The southern part of Albert Street is low-lying and prone to flooding; it was part of the historic Frog's Hollow district. The Brisbane City Council has a vision to turn Albert Street into a subtropical boulevard linking the Roma Street Parklands and Wickham Park with the City Botanic Gardens. In the 2014 City Centre Master Plan, Albert Street is marked as a park to park link. In the plan the street aims to cater for casual outdoor dining as well as pedestrian access to large scale events at the King George Square and Riverstage.

== History ==
Albert Street is one of the earliest streets in Brisbane.

Albert Hall was an entertainment venue from 1901 to 1969 on the north side of Albert Street between Ann Street and Turbot Street, to the left of Albert Street Methodist (now Uniting) Church. Albert Hall was replaced by the SGIO / Suncorp Building.

Albert Street originally ran from Alice Street to Wickham Terrace. The section between Adelaide Street and Ann Street was closed to traffic in 1968 and now forms part of King George Square in front of Brisbane City Hall.

The section of Albert Street between Queen Street Mall and Adelaide Street has now been converted into part of the Mall, in connection with the busway tunnel from the Queen Street bus station to the King George Square busway station.

An underground railway station is expected to open in Albert Street as part of the Cross River Rail project.

In the 1940s, an American soldier batooned and injured his Australian counterpart here.

== Heritage listings ==
Albert Street has a number of heritage-listed sites, including:

- Albert Park (South) Air Raid Shelter, Upper Albert Street
- Perry House, 167 Albert Street
- Albert Street Uniting Church, 319 Albert Street

== Other notable buildings ==
At 102 Albert Street, the site of the now demolished Brisbane Festival Hall, is Festival Towers, an apartment building offering short-term accommodation.

123 Albert Street is an office building that was completed in 2011. It has achieved 6 stars on the Green Star environmental rating.

== Gallery ==
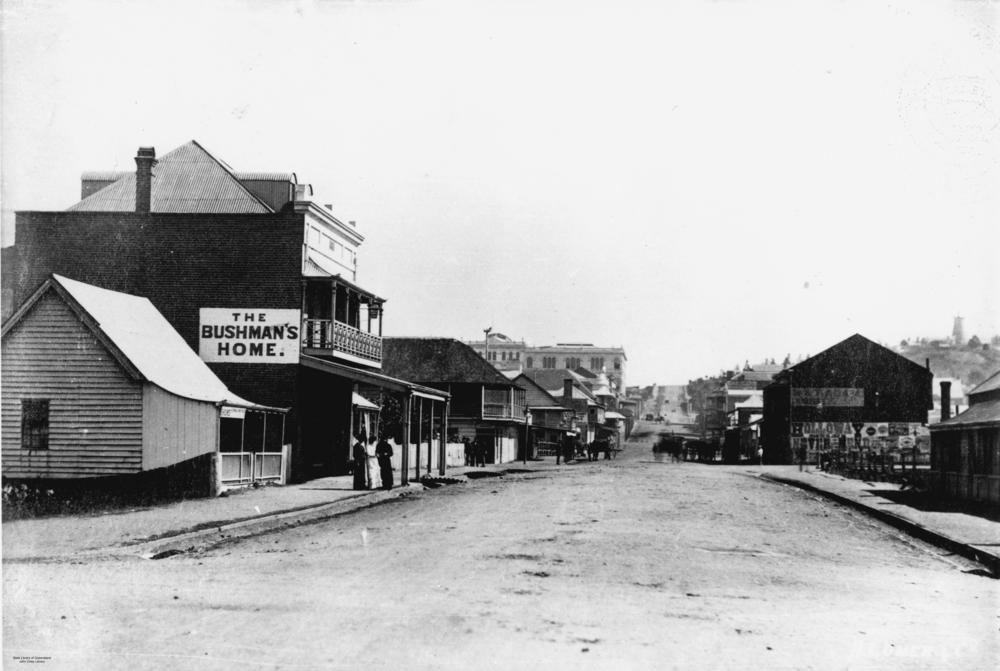
Albert Street c. 1883

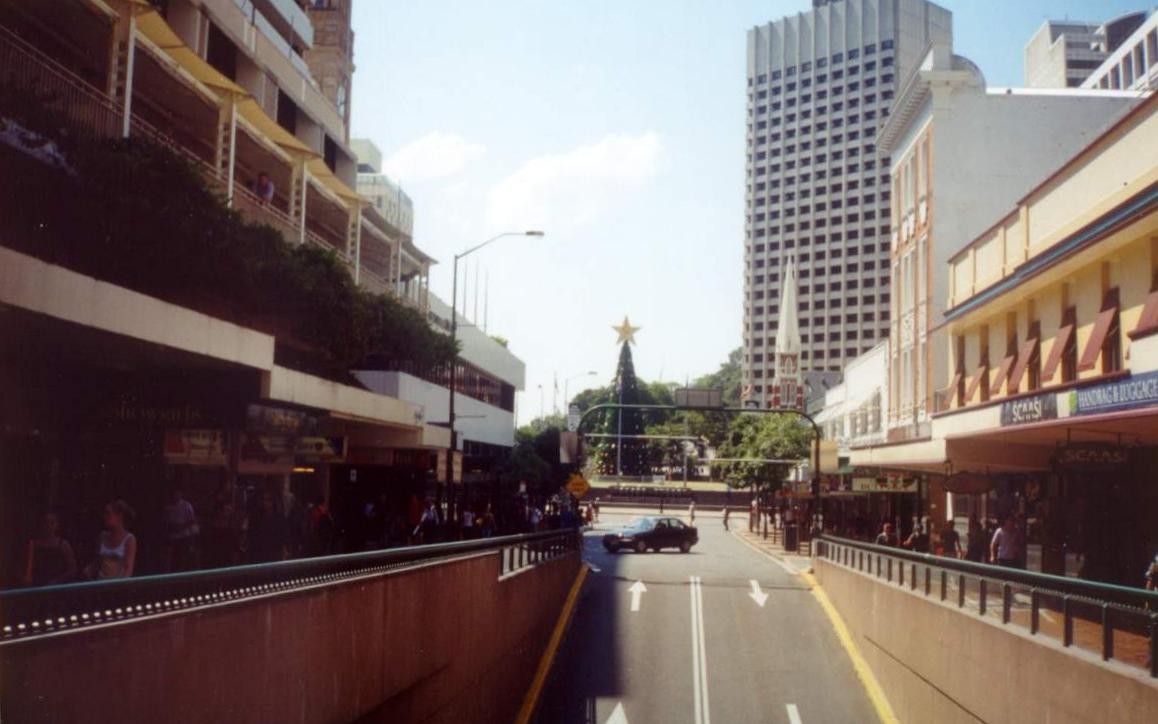
The former Albert Street exit portal for the Queen Street bus station, which has now been converted into part of the Mall.

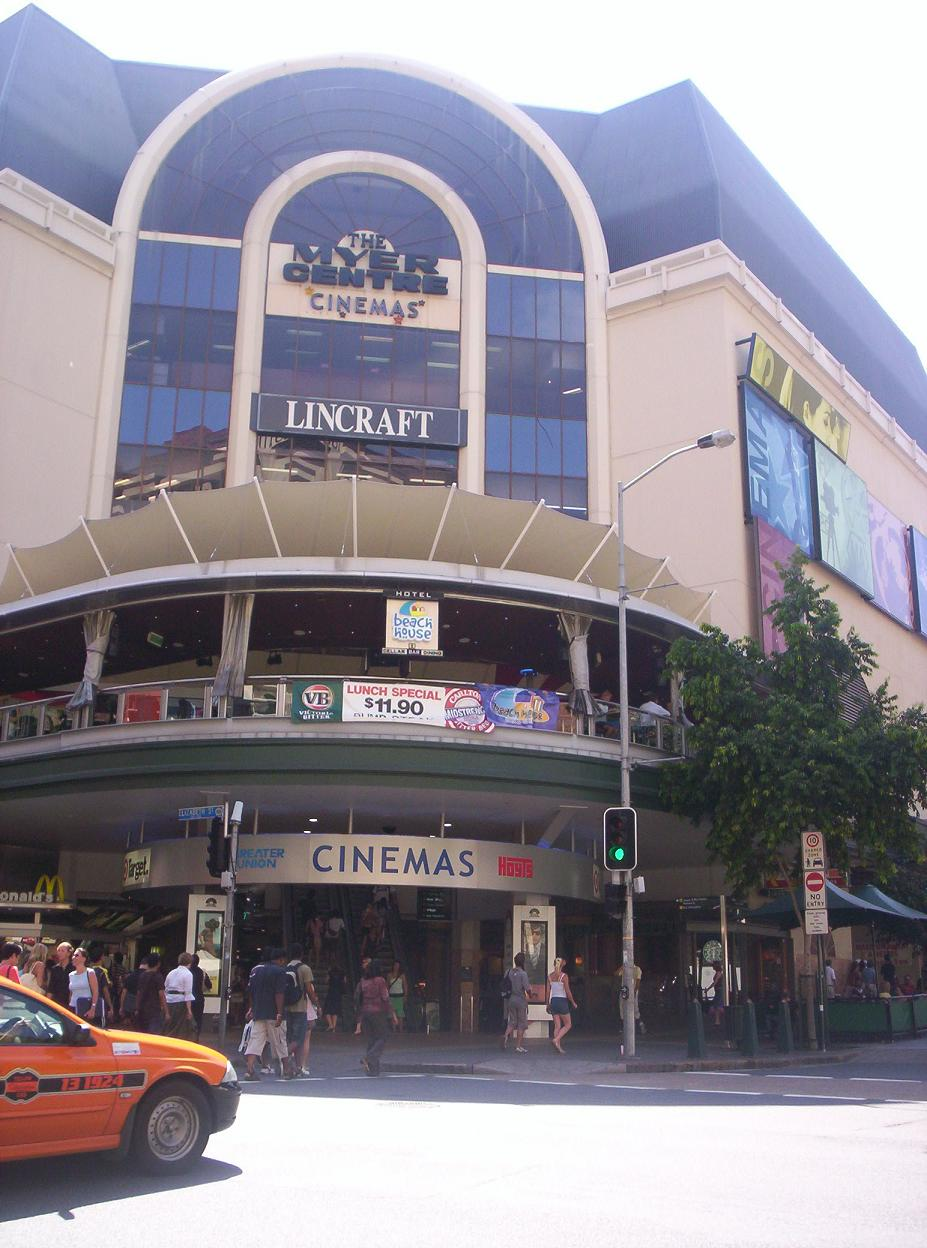
Uptown entrance at the intersection of Albert Street and Elizabeth Street, and the Queen Street Mall

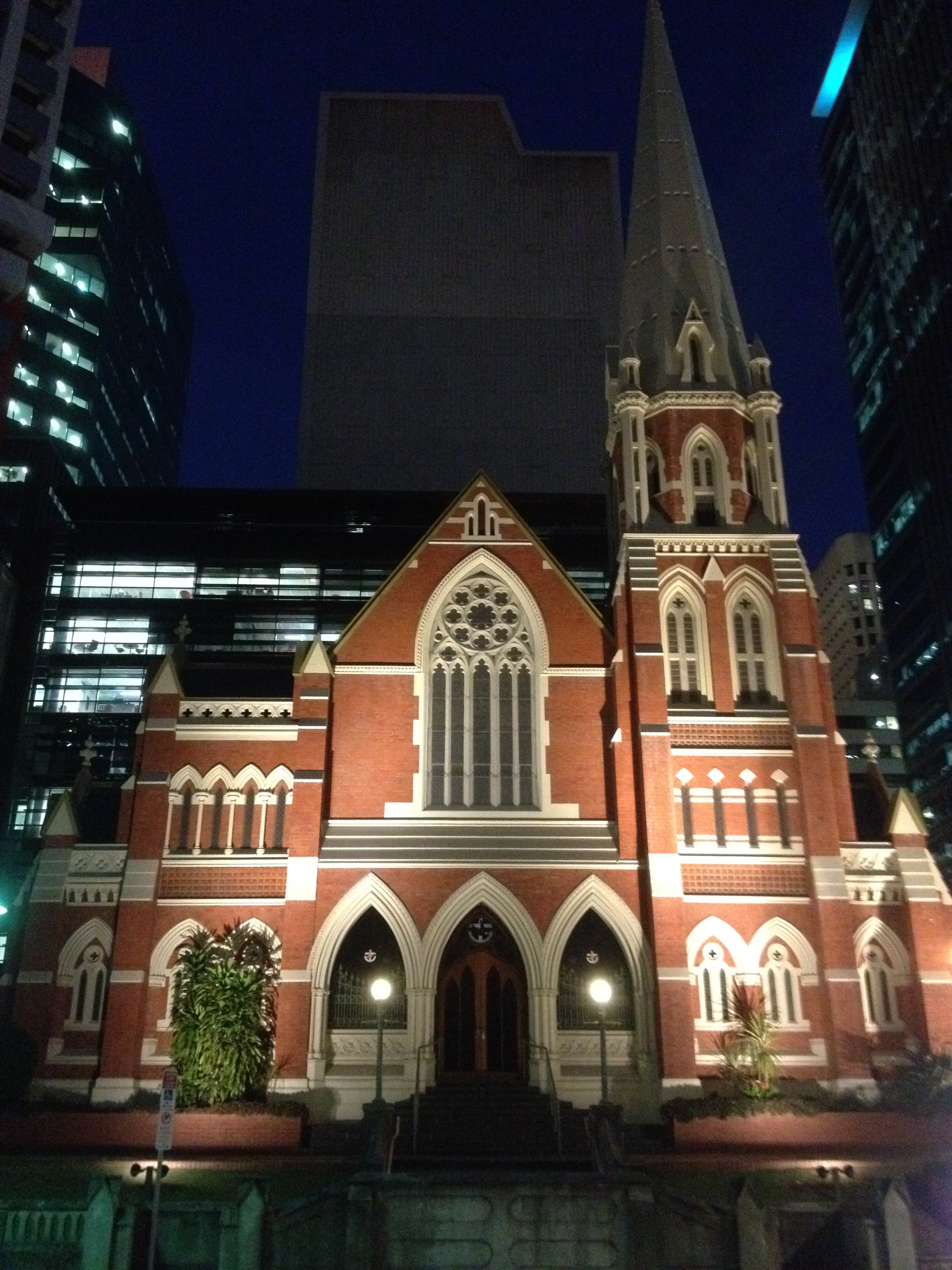
Albert Street Uniting Church

== Major intersections ==
- Alice Street
- Margaret Street
- Mary Street
- Charlotte Street
- Elizabeth Street
- Queen Street
- Adelaide Street
- Ann Street
- Turbot Street
- Wickham Terrace

== See also ==
- Road transport in Brisbane
