= Charlotte Street, Brisbane =

Street in Brisbane, Queensland

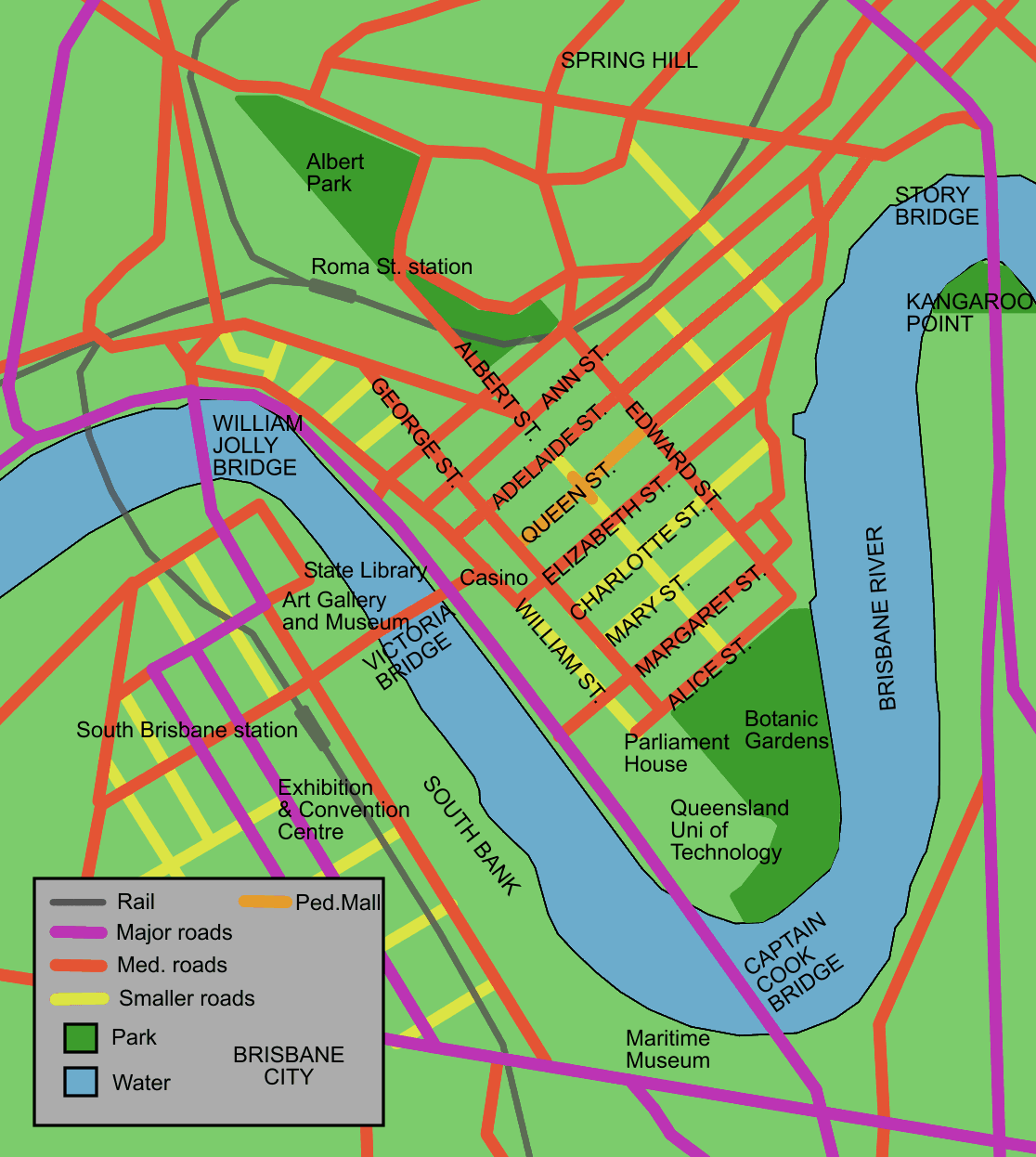
Map of Brisbane City streets

Charlotte Street is a road in the central business district of Brisbane, Queensland, Australia. The street is one of a number that were named after female members of the royal family shortly after the penal colony was settled. Mary Street runs parallel to the south and Elizabeth Street is the next street to the north.

The one-directional road begins at a T-intersection where Creek Street becomes Eagle Street, close to the Brisbane River. Charlotte Street ends at another T-intersection with George Street. Here lies the 111 George Street tower containing mostly government offices.

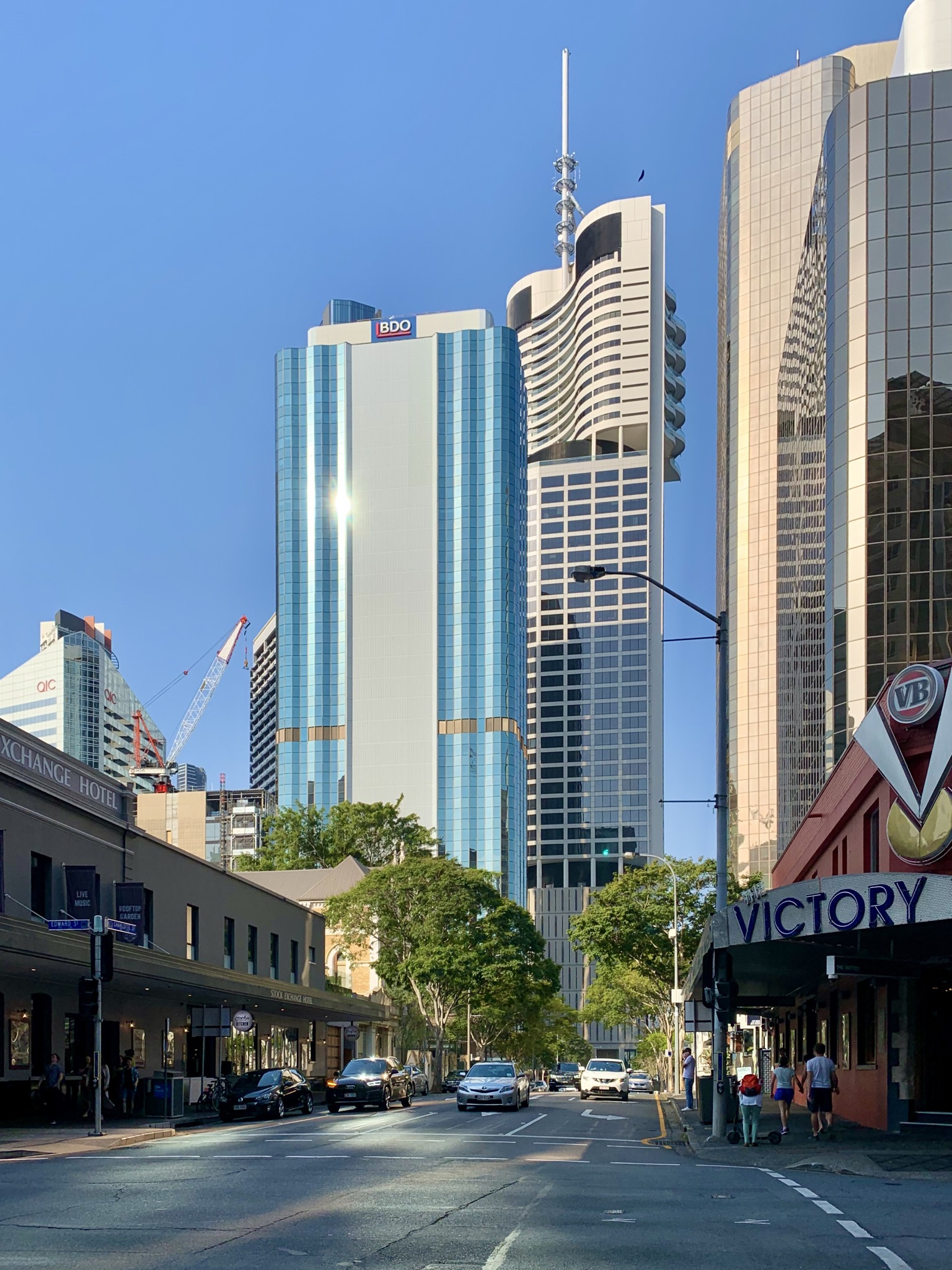
Charlotte Street in 2019

Charlotte Towers and Festival Towers are two tall residential buildings in Charlotte Street. The Elizabeth Arcade, St Stephens Cathedral, Comalco Place and The Pancake Manor are some of the other notable buildings located on Charlotte Street.

A number of multi-storey car parks have been built on the road. A police station once located on the Queen Street Mall was transferred to Charlotte Street. The iconic Victory Hotel, also on Charlotte Street, closed on 27 July 2008 after a fire destroyed the premises. It has since re-opened in its original form.

== History ==
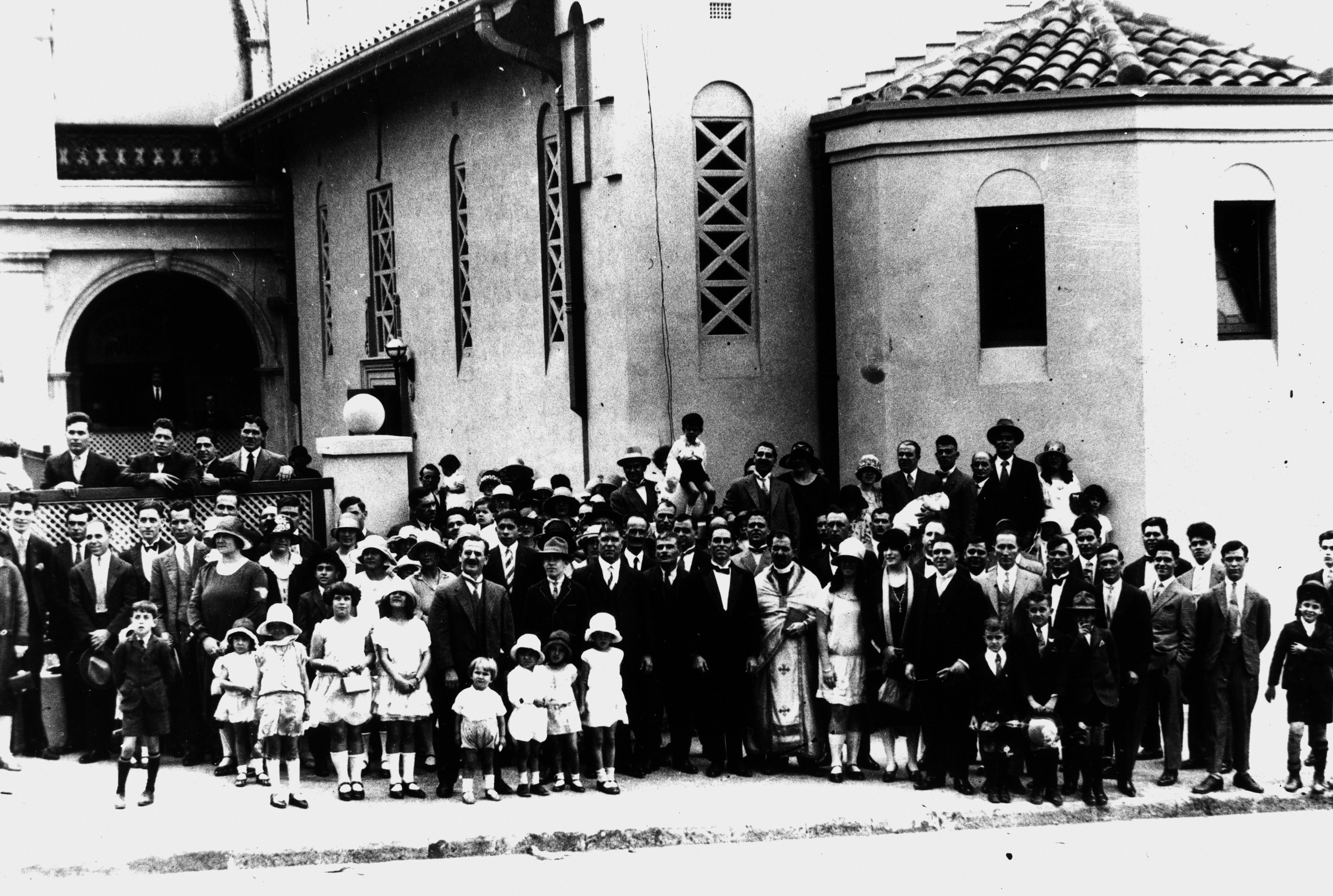
Congregation of St George's Greek Orthodox Church in Charlotte Street, 1929

The Greek Association of Brisbane was established in 1913. In May 1921 it purchased Concordia Hall at 44–48 Charlotte Street (27.4717°S 153.0259°E) and renamed it Hellenic House to be used as a gathering place for the Greek community. Greek Orthodox services in Brisbane were initially conducted in St Luke's Anglican Church (also in Charlotte Street) and the Wharf Street Congregational Church, until St George's was officially opened as the first Greek Orthodox church in Queensland in front of Hellenic House on 30 March 1929. However, the growth in Brisbane's Greek population, particularly after World War II, resulted in a need for a larger church. A new St George's Greek Orthodox Church was built at 33 Edmondstone Street (corner Besant Street) at South Brisbane (27.4799°S 153.0156°E) and opened on 24 April 1960. A new Greek community centre (now the Greek Club) was built beside the South Brisbane church, opening in 1976. The Charlotte Street property was sold in 1981 and the Greek buildings on the site no longer exist.

== Heritage listings ==
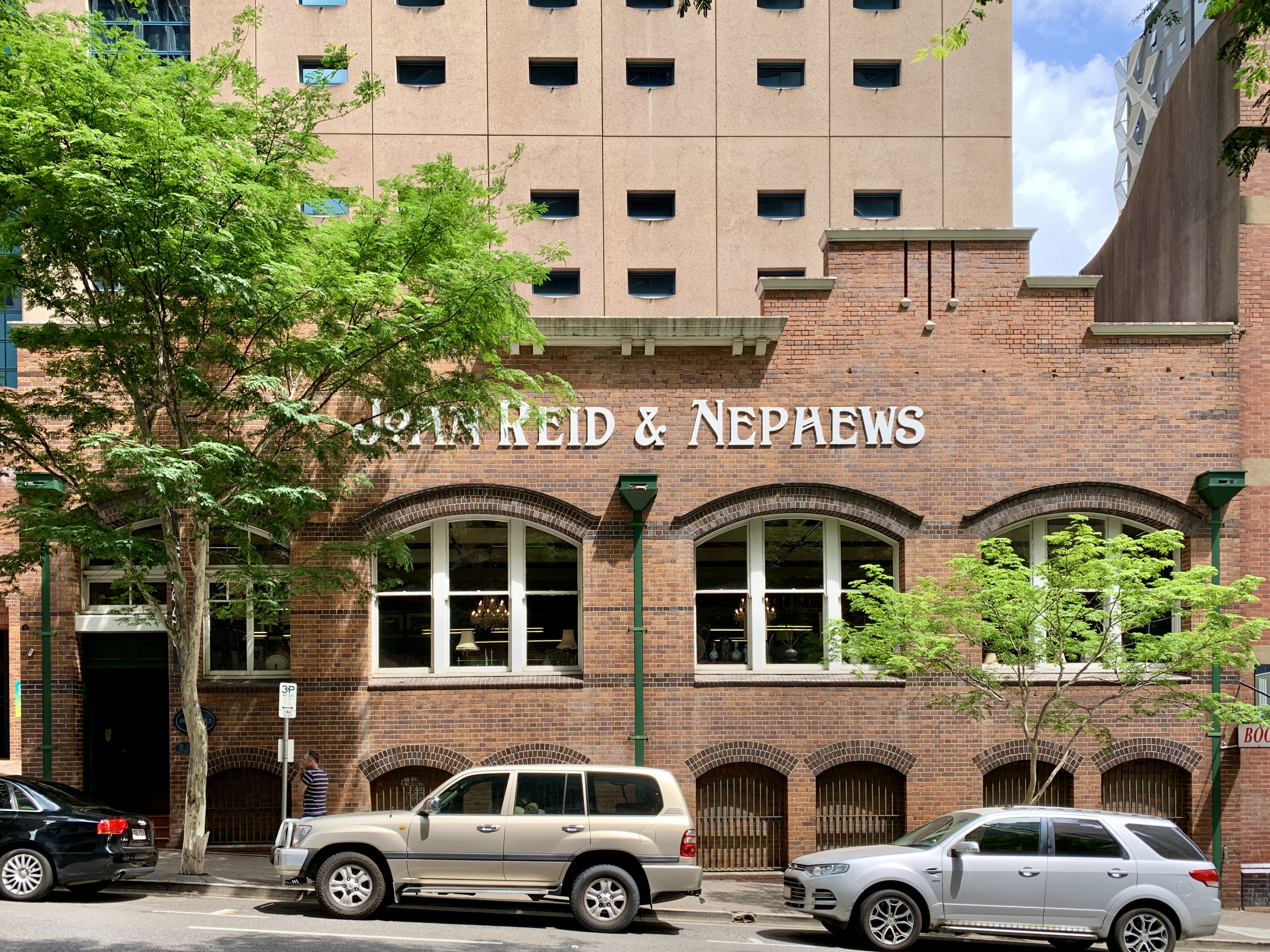
John Reid & Nephews Building facade, 2020

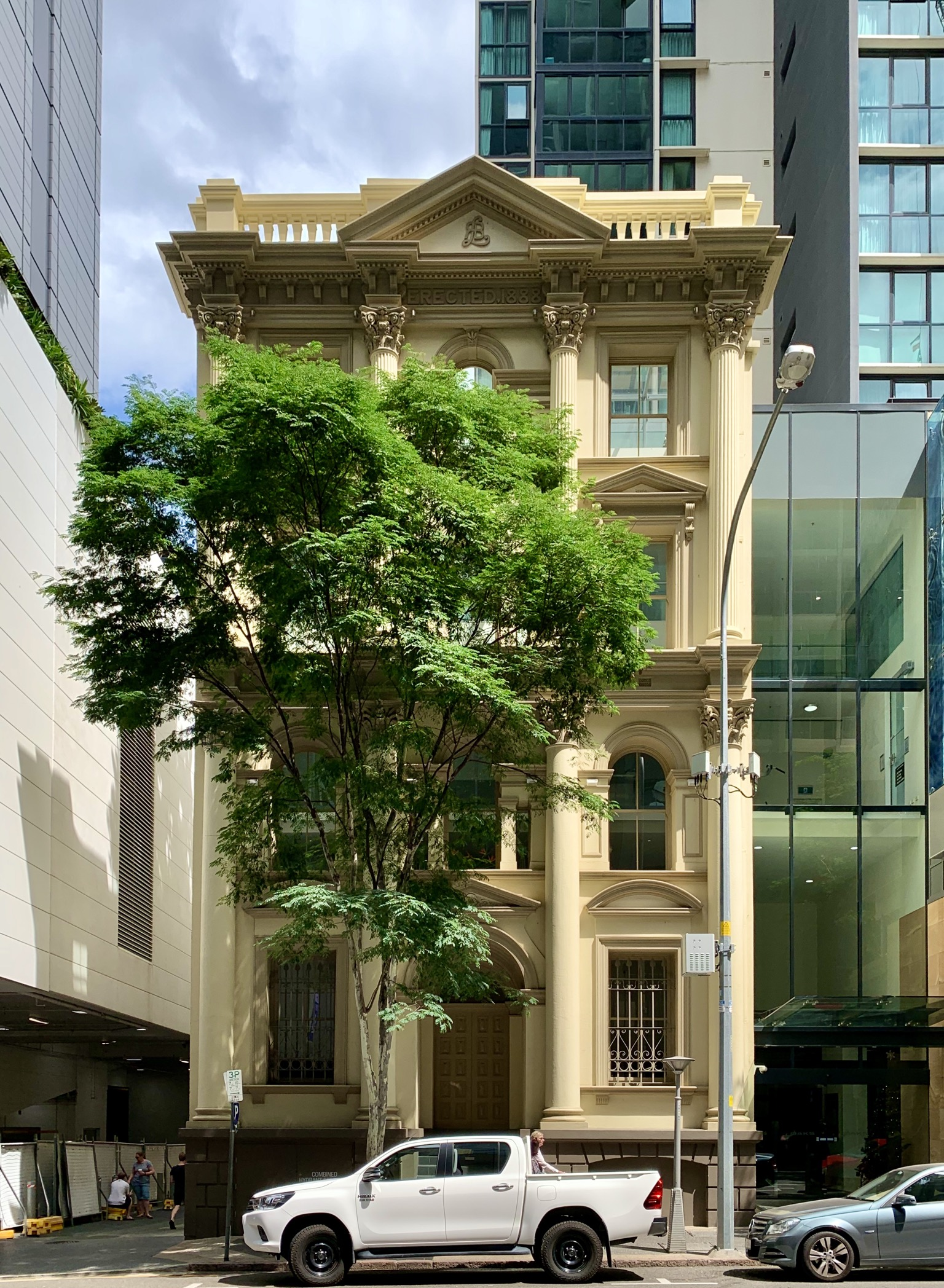
Pan Australia House facade, 2020

Charlotte Street has a number of heritage-listed sites, including:

- 10 Charlotte Street: former St Luke's Church of England, now The Pancake Manor
- 26 & 36 Charlotte Street: John Reid and Nephews Building facade
- 40 Charlotte Street: John Mills Himself Building
- 42 Charlotte Street: George Weston and Sons Workshop
- 120 Charlotte Street: Pan Australia House facade
- 139–145 Charlotte Street: Charlotte House
- 163 Charlotte Street: Walter Reid Building facade
- 168 Charlotte Street: F.H. Faulding Warehouse
- 172 Charlotte Street: St Stephens School
- Sections of Albert St, George St, William St, North Quay, Queen's Wharf Rd: Early Streets of Brisbane (incorporating land now on Charlotte Street)
- 110 George Street and 84 William Street: the former Queensland Government Printing Office

Lost heritage includes:

- Brisbane Festival Hall (formerly Brisbane Stadium) on the southern corner with Albert Street

== Major intersections ==
- George Street
- Albert Street
- Edward Street
- Creek Street / Eagle Street

== See also ==
- 144 Edward Street, Brisbane
- Adelaide Street
- Alice Street
- Ann Street
- Elizabeth Street
- Margaret Street
- Mary Street
- Queen Street
