= Charlotte House =

Heritage-listed building in Brisbane, Queensland

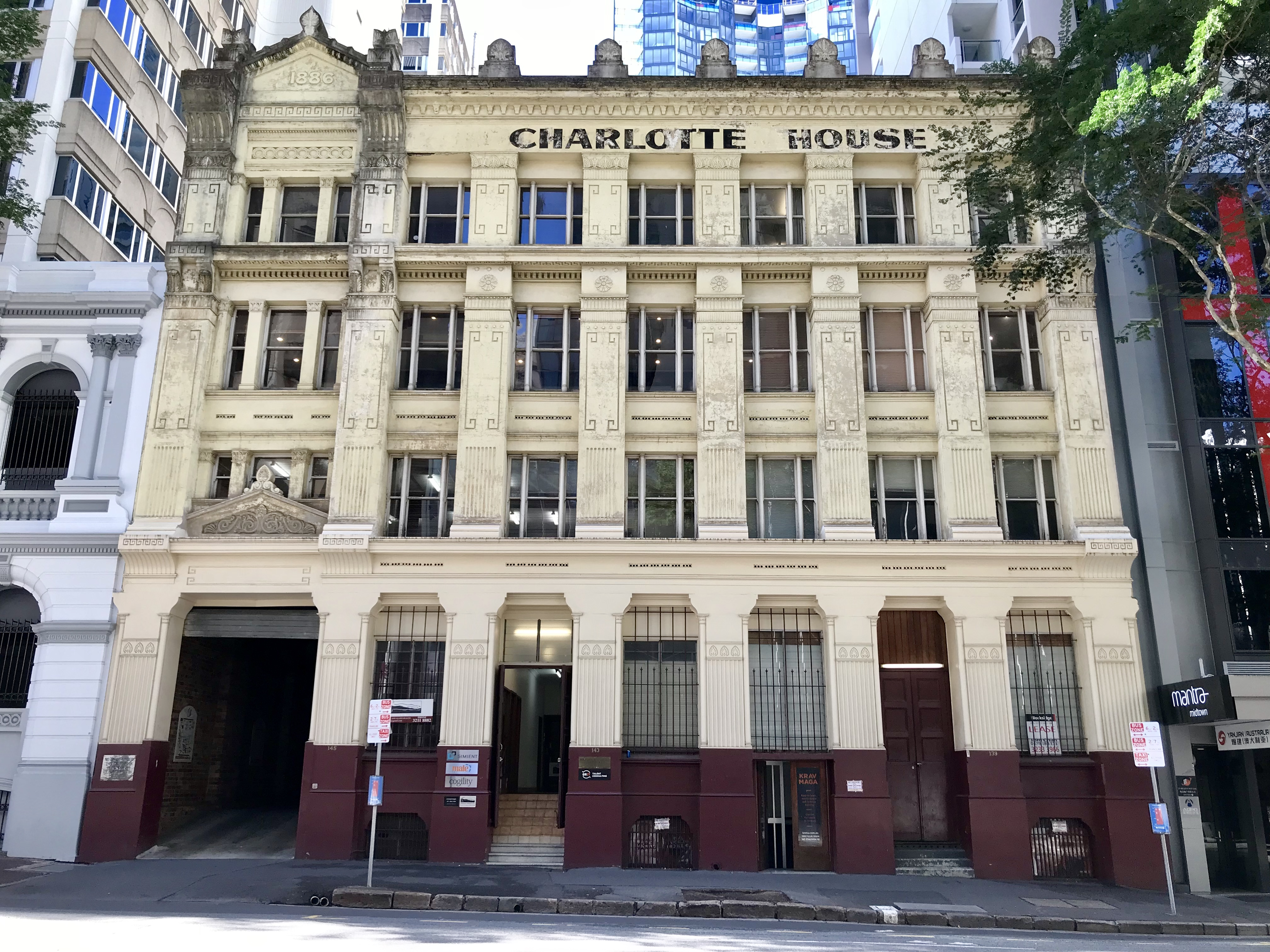
- Charlotte House, Brisbane, 2018

- Location within Queensland Location within Australia
- 27.4707°S 153.0279°E
- Location: 139–145 Charlotte Street, Brisbane CBD, City of Brisbane, Queensland, Australia

History
- Design period: 1870s–1890s (late 19th century)
- Built: 1888–1889

Site notes
- Architect: John Joseph Lough

Queensland Heritage Register
- Official name: Charlotte House
- Type: state heritage (built)
- Designated: 21 October 1992
- Reference no.: 600082
- Significant period: 1888–1889 (fabric)
- Significant components: carriage/wagon/dray entrance, store/s / storeroom / storehouse, warehouse
- Builders: James Baker

Charlotte House is a heritage-listed warehouse at 139–145 Charlotte Street, Brisbane CBD, City of Brisbane, Queensland, Australia. It was designed by John Joseph Lough and built from 1888 to 1889 by James Baker. It was added to the Queensland Heritage Register on 21 October 1992.

== History ==
This four storeyed warehouse was erected in 1888–89. Built for Wallace Warren & Co, merchants, importers, bonded warehousemen and shipping agents, Charlotte House was designed by John Joseph Lough. In the early 1880s, Lough had been in partnership with Benjamin Backhouse in Sydney and his unusual choice of Greek and Egyptian motifs for the building reflects similar work by Backhouse in Sydney on a warehouse for Dalton Brothers in the late 1870s.

The construction of this warehouse in Charlotte Street reflected the emergence of the immediate area as a warehousing precinct. Formerly known as Frog's Hollow, by the late 1880s, the area was dominated by warehouses and also industrial buildings.

Between 1889 and 1894, Wallace Warren & Co operated their business from the building but following the depression of the early 1890s, they were declared bankrupt in 1894. The new owners, the Commercial Banking Company of Sydney, leased the building to various tenants including Crescent Packing Co which processed and packaged coffee and spice bags there, box manufacturers Joyce Brothers, and Cecil Edgar Babbidge, a printer and stereotyper. Between 1911 and 1919 the prominent Sydney-based tea merchants, Inglis Ltd, distributors of the Billy Tea brand, occupied part of the building. Their distinctive sign covered the entire length of the southern wall.

From 1912 to 1963 the building was owned by the ironmongers Robertson Tait & Co then by its successor Wilson Tait, wholesale hardware merchants.

The new owners in 1963, Charlotte House Pty Ltd, carried out extensive internal alterations in 1964. Currently, the building is occupied by a variety of commercial tenants.

== Description ==
This timber frame, brick and cement render warehouse with four storeys and basement stands in Charlotte Street. At the north-eastern end of the building a highly differentiated bay marks a carriage entrance.

Large pilasters separate six window openings and the carriageway bay. Three of these pilasters mark the ends of the building and the carriageway bay and are distinguished, by greater ornamentation, from the five "minor" pilasters. At basement and ground floors, the pilasters are fluted whilst those at the upper levels carry a Greek linear pattern.

Two protruding string courses, one above the ground floor and another above the second floor, define the three sections of the building. The underside of the upper string course carries a row of fine dentils and an inscribed Greek pattern. Fluted brackets mark the ends of the building and the carriageway bay which is further distinguished by a richly moulded pediment above the first string course. Above the minor pilasters of the upper floor the painted lettering "Charlotte House" is surmounted by a moulded cornice. The major pilasters extend to deeply fluted brackets and at the roof line, another pediment marked "1886" distinguishes the carriageway bay. The point of this pediment and the line of each of the eight pilasters is accented on the roof by acroteria.

Behind the building is a two-storey brick store which was constructed as part of the original project.

While substantial internal alterations were carried out on the building in 1964, both the structure and the facade remain intact. The timber framing, floor joists and herringbone strutting are evident on the underside of the first floor carriageway.

== Heritage listing ==
Charlotte House was listed on the Queensland Heritage Register on 21 October 1992 having satisfied the following criteria.

The place is important in demonstrating the evolution or pattern of Queensland's history.

Charlotte House is significant as it provides evidence of the emergence of the Frogs Hollow area as a warehousing precinct. The building remains as a reminder of this previous function of the area.

The place demonstrates rare, uncommon or endangered aspects of Queensland's cultural heritage.

Charlotte House is significant as a rare and good example of a late nineteenth century warehouse, with an intact facade which incorporates Greek and Egyptian motifs.

The place is important in demonstrating the principal characteristics of a particular class of cultural places.

Charlotte House is significant as a rare and good example of a late nineteenth century warehouse, with an intact facade which incorporates Greek and Egyptian motifs.

The place is important because of its aesthetic significance.

Charlotte House is significant as a rare and good example of a late nineteenth century warehouse, with an intact facade which incorporates Greek and Egyptian motifs.
