= Edward Street, Brisbane =

Street in Brisbane, Queensland, Australia

Coordinates: 27°28′07.39″S 153°01′38.30″E

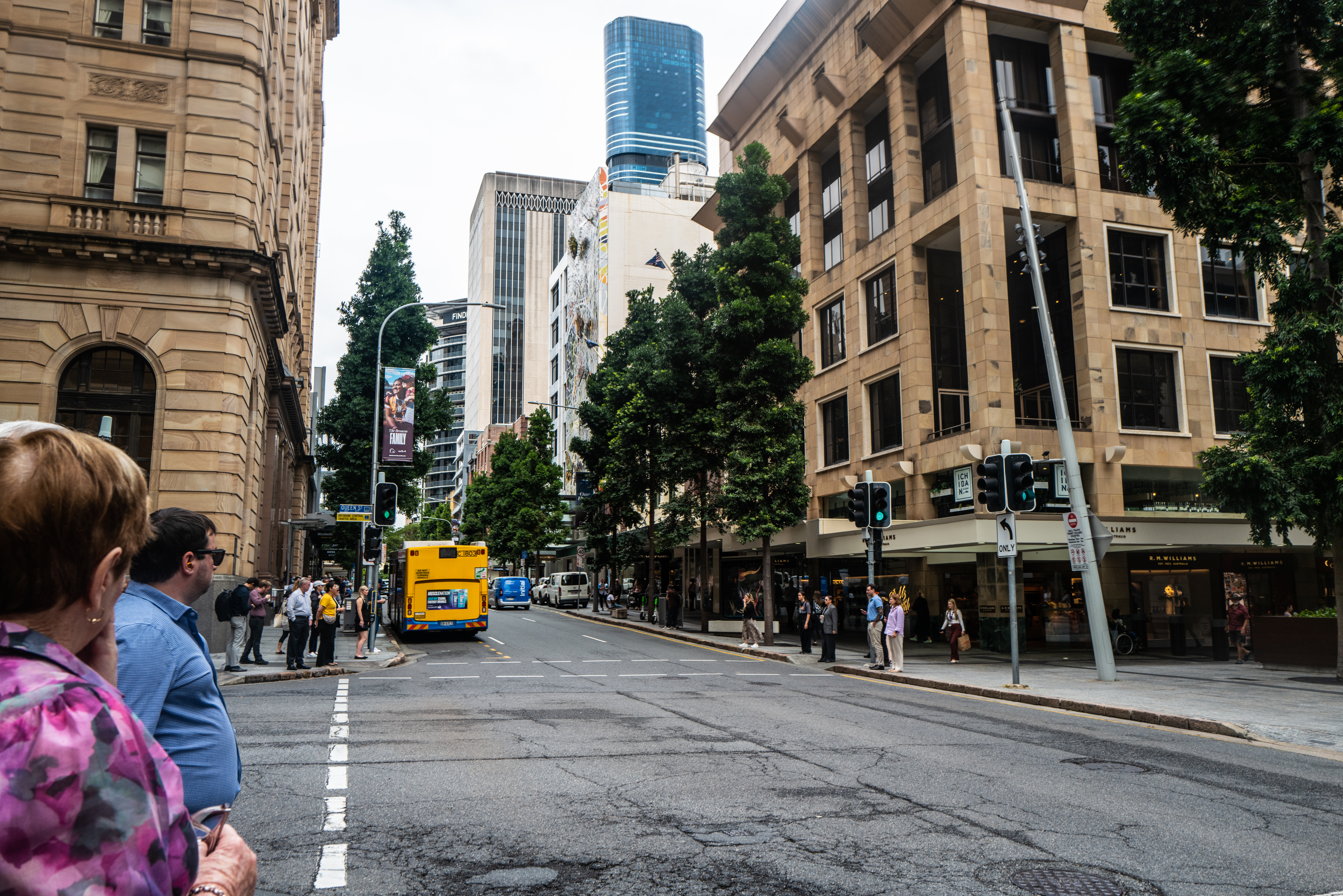
Edward street at the intersection with Queen Street

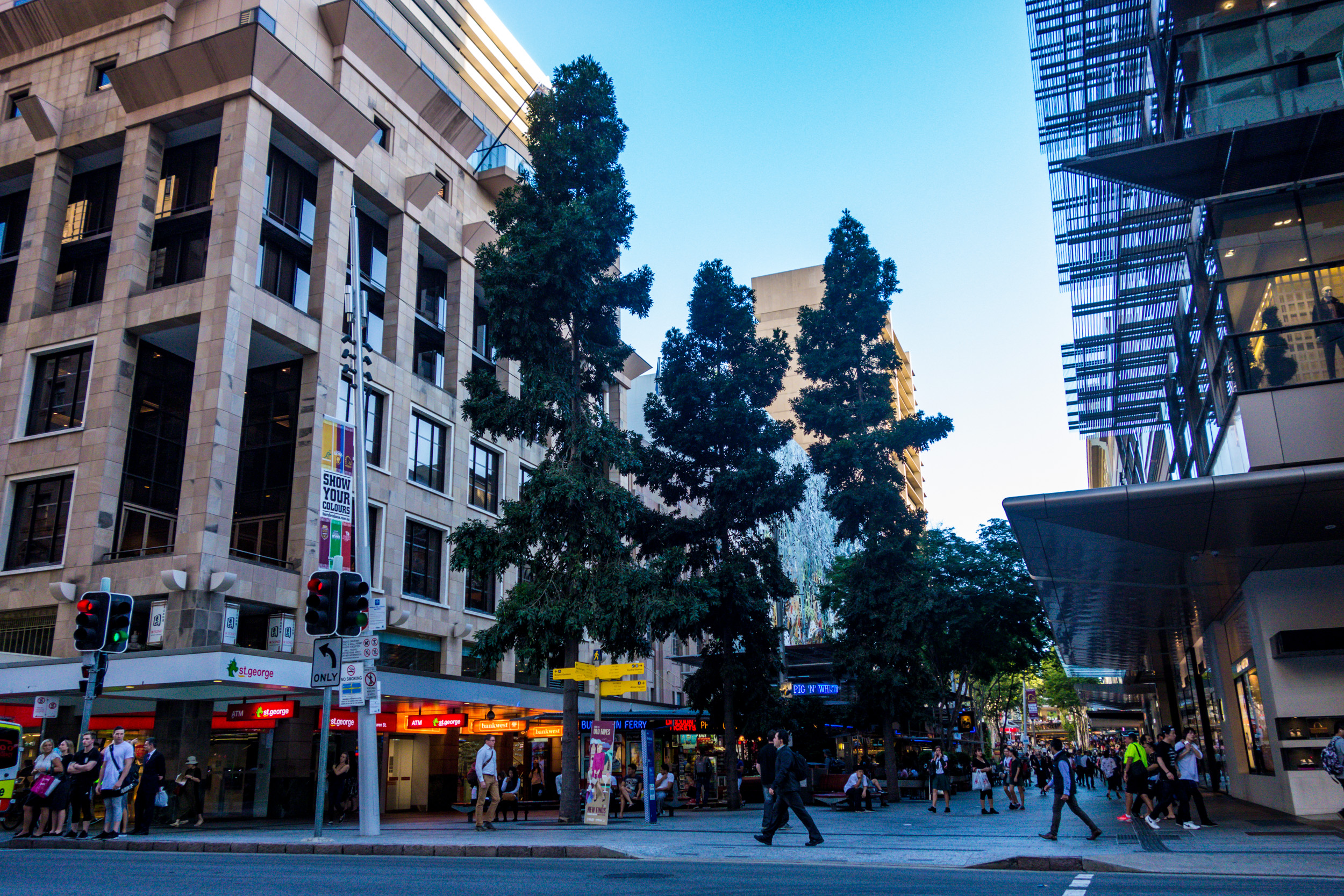
Queen Street Mall at the Edward Street and Queen Street intersection

Edward Street is a busy thoroughfare in the Brisbane central business district, Queensland, Australia. It is a one-way street located between Albert Street and Creek Street, and runs from Upper Edward Street to Alice Street. It is named for Edward VII.

A number of prominent Brisbane landmarks are situated on Edward Street. The Central Station, the Queen Street Mall, the Metro Arts Theatre and the City Botanic Gardens can be accessed from Edward Street.

A number of Brisbane CBD shopping centres have entrances from Edward Street. These include QueensPlaza, Wintergarden, MacArthur Central, ANZAC Square Arcade and Rowes Arcade.

== History ==
In 1866 a Baptist Church opened in Edward Street.

== Heritage listings ==
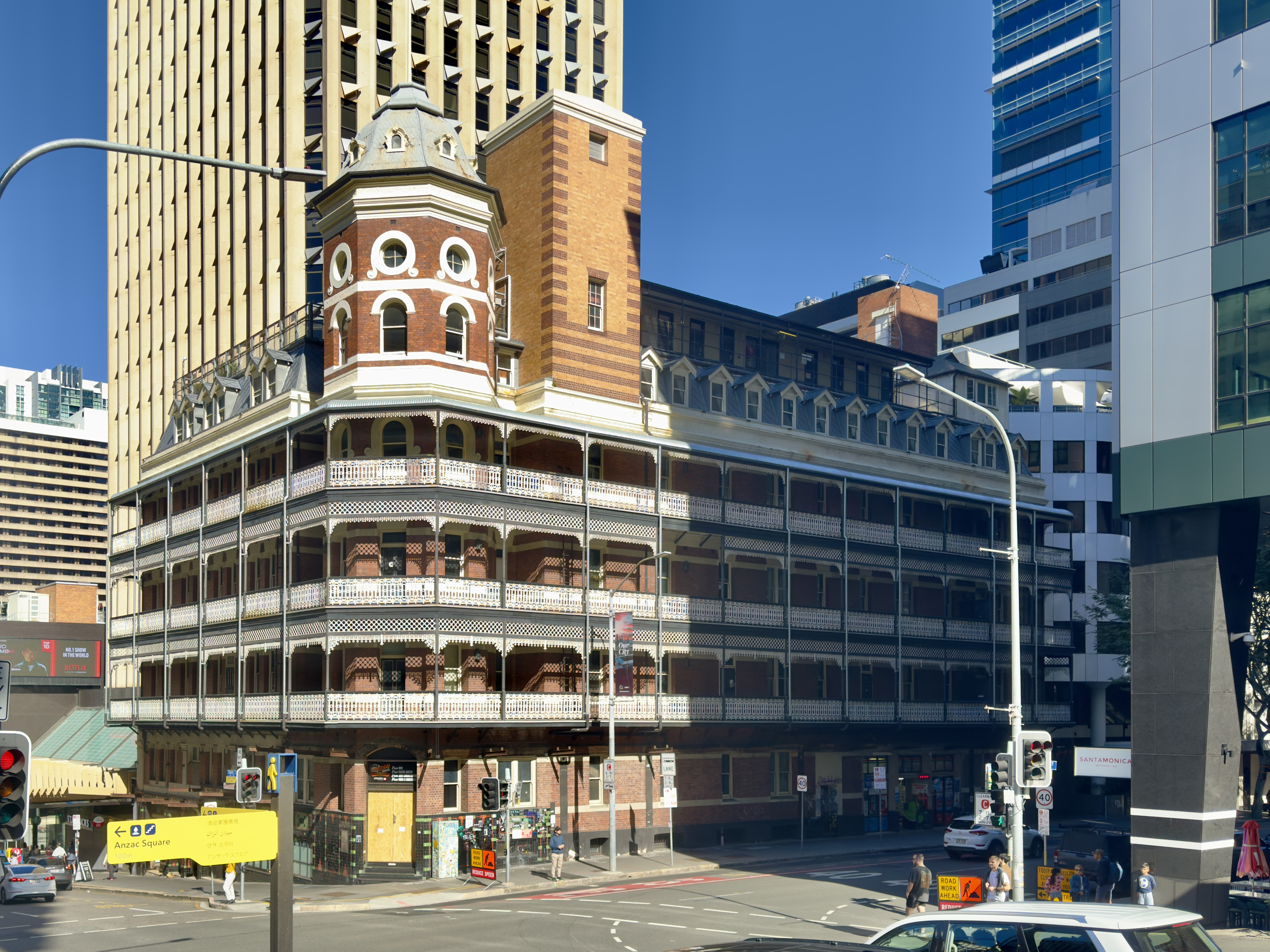
The People's Palace

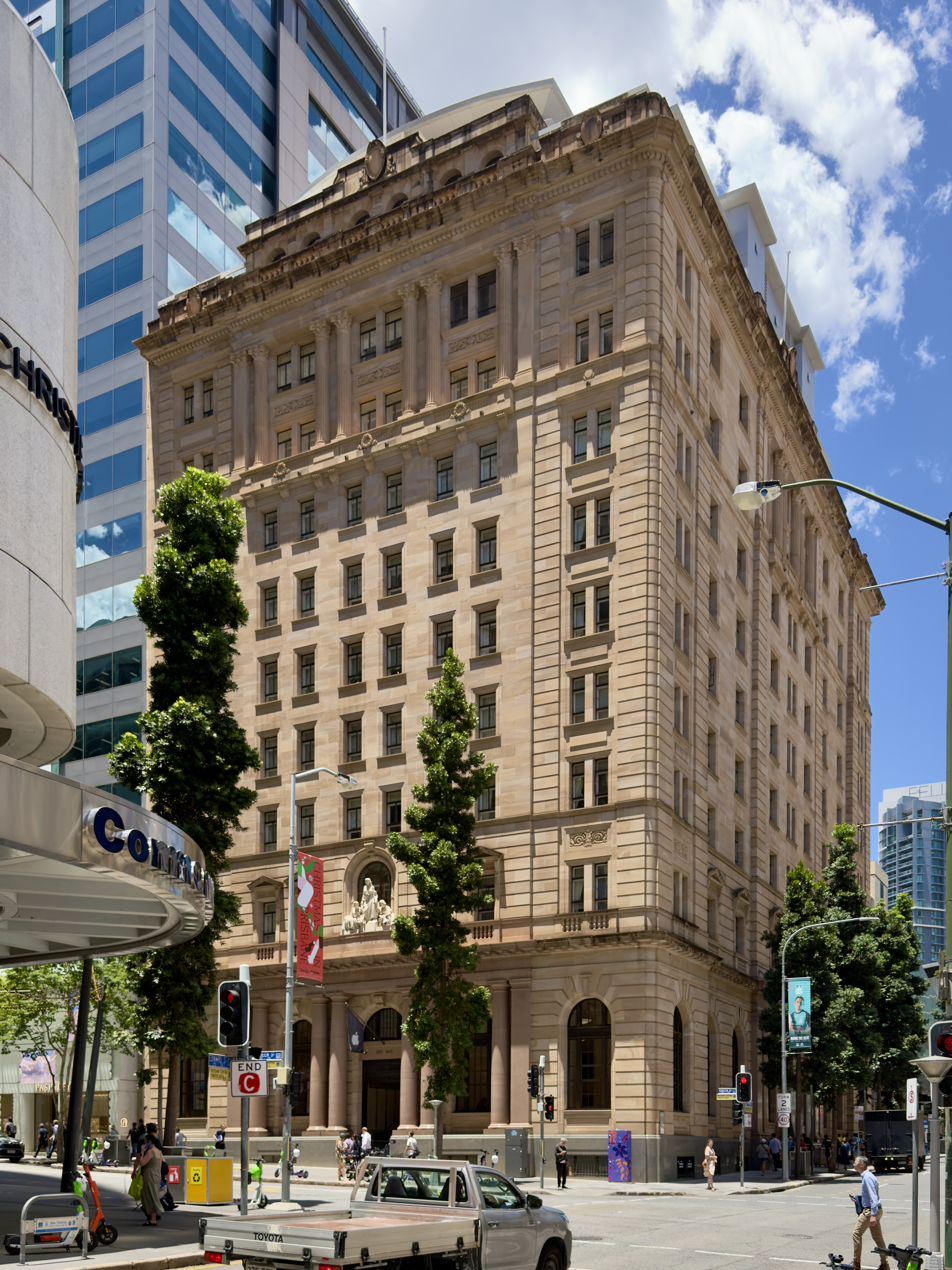
MacArthur Chambers Queen Street and Edward Street facades

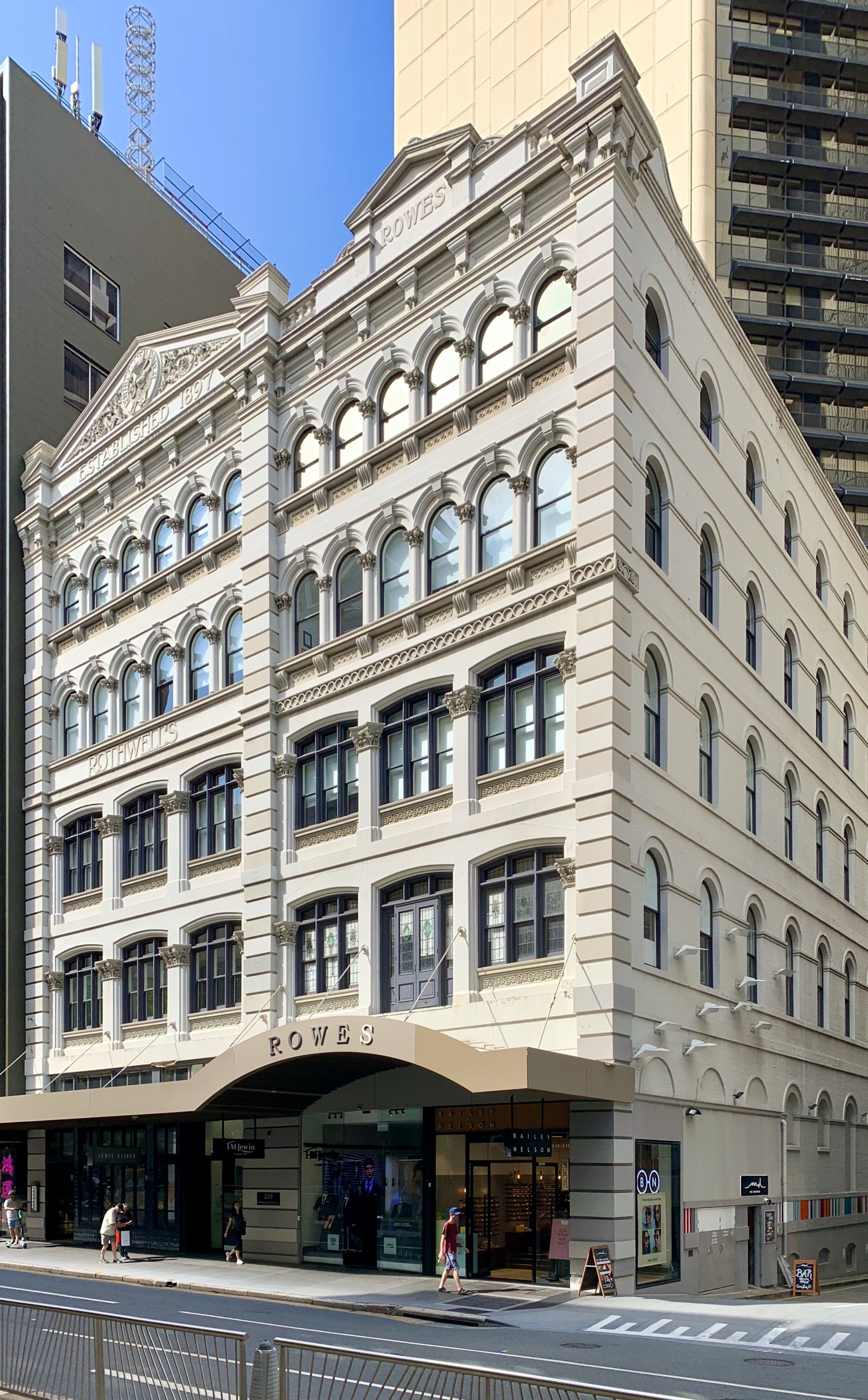
Rothwell and Rowes buildings

There are a number of heritage-listed sites in Edward Street, including:

- 2 Edward Street: Old Mineral House
- 3 Edward Street: former Naval Offices
- 32 Edward Street: Smellie's Building
- 39 Edward Street: former Port Office
- 40 Edward Street: Port Office Hotel
- 41 Edward Street: South East Queensland Water Board Building
- 47–51 Edward Street: Spencers Building
- 93–103 Edward Street: Youngs Building
- 104 Edward Street: former Henry Box & Son – Coachbuilders Building
- 109–117 Edward Street: Metro Arts Theatre
- 127 Edward Street: Victory Hotel
- 131 Edward Street: The Exchange Hotel (also known as Stock Exchange Hotel)
- 149 Edward Street: Catholic Centre
- 166 Edward Street: Pioneer House
- 172 Edward Street: Invicta House
- 178 Edward Street: Embassy Hotel
- 206 Edward Street: Tattersalls Club
- 235 Edward Street: Rowes Building
- 237 Edward Street: Rothwells Building
- 308 Edward Street: People's Palace
- Edward Street: City Electric & Light (CEL) Company Manhole Cover

== Cafes of Edward Street ==
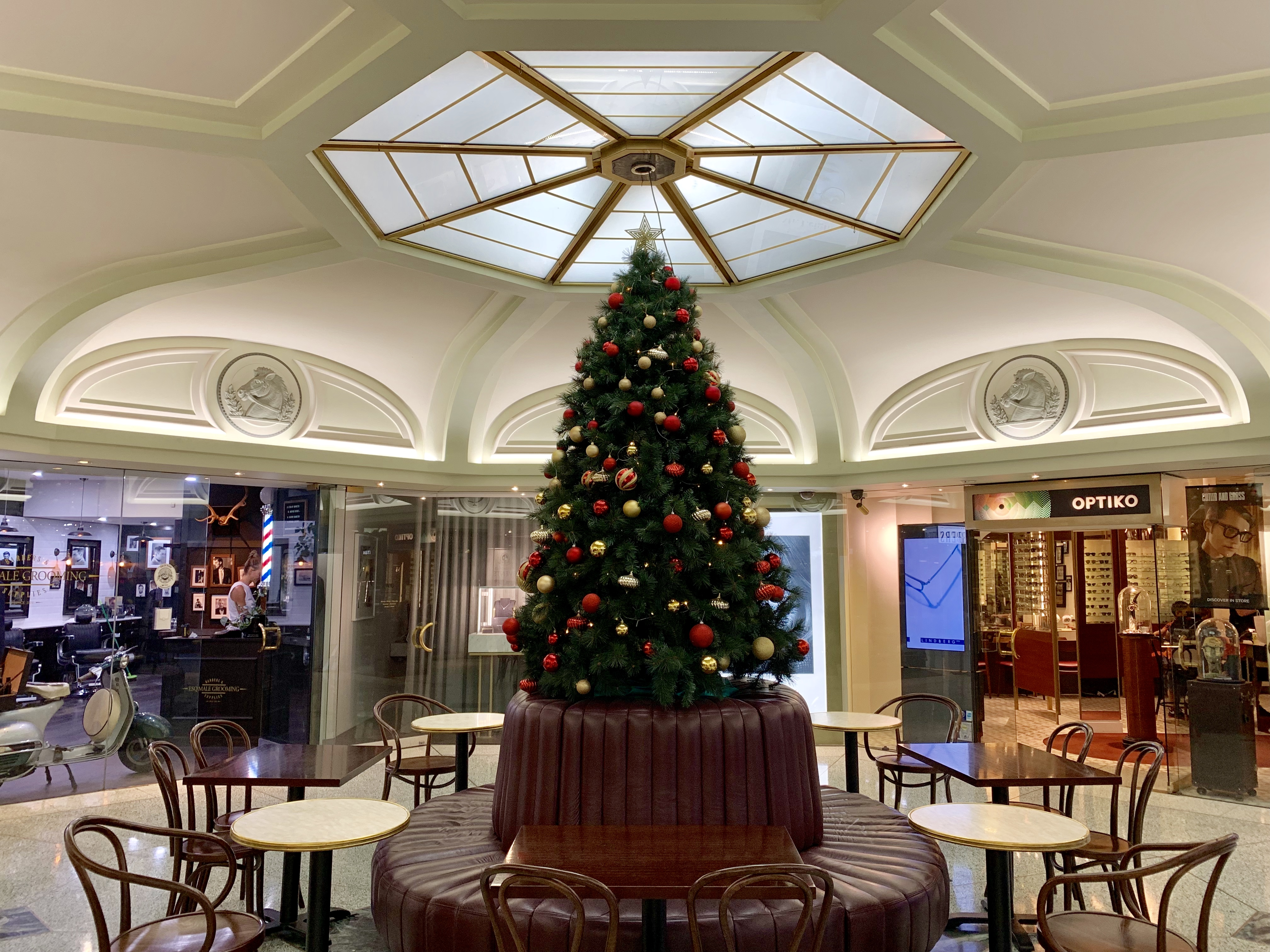
Tattersalls Club during Christmas

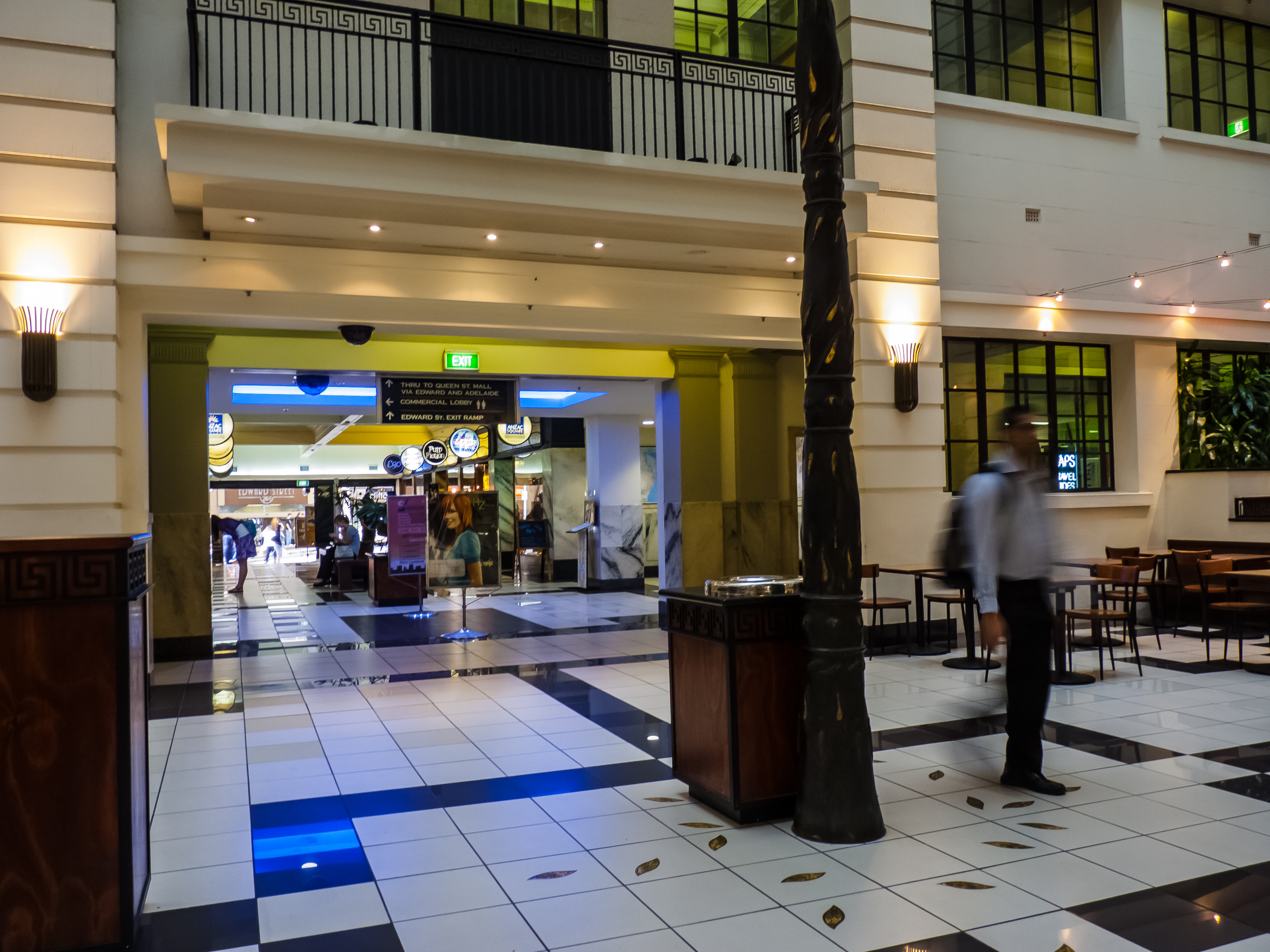
Anzac Square Building arcade through to Edward Street

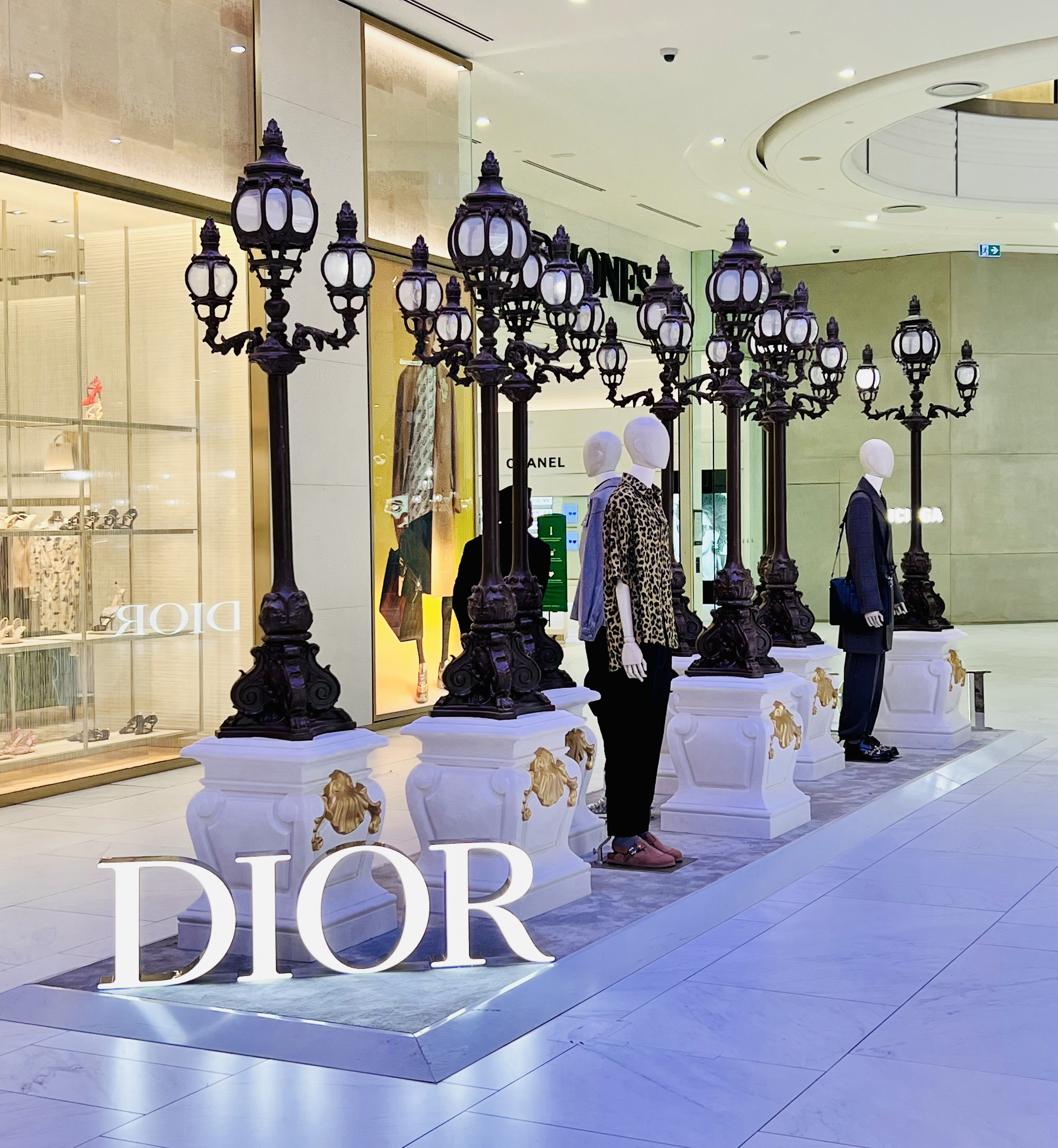
Dior advertisement at QueensPlaza

The Shingle Inn at 254 Edward Street was a listed heritage café. When the building was demolished in 2002 to make way for the QueensPlaza shopping mall, the café's fittings were removed and stored. In 2013, the café was re-established using the original fittings within Brisbane City Hall.

A number of Greek owned and run cafes also featured in Edward Street during the twentieth century. Ellisos Cafe, owned by Con Tsiros ran from 1914–1923. Next door to this cafe Tsiros also opened The Garden of Roses Cafe at 242 Edward Street which ran from 1915–1928 and later The Continental Cafe. They served a clientele who enjoyed the 7am to 11pm opening hours. The Garden of Roses Cafe featured German and French chefs, and offered a European range of delicacies The artist Lloyd Rees reflected on the special favour it was to visit The Garden of Roses Cafe in his autobiography. Many of the stores featured Art Deco finishes.

== Luxury shopping ==
Edward Street is the central avenue in Brisbane's upmarket shopping district. Many national and international fashion, jewellery and homewares stores have boutiques on Edward Street.

=== History of Edward Street shopping ===
Edward Street is home to Brisbane's luxury fashion and jewellery brands, with many shopping centres having high-end precincts that front onto Edward St, as well as stand-alone stores. QueensPlaza's Edward Street frontage has the likes of Louis Vuitton, Chanel, Salvatore Ferragamo, Tiffany & Co., Paspaley and Burberry. MacArthur Central has Ralph Lauren, Oroton, Rhodes & Beckett and Tag Heuer. Other brands have boutiques located further down towards the Botanic Gardens.

In April 2011, it was announced that the former Dymocks store in the heritage listed MacArthur Chambers would be redeveloped into an Apple Store. The proposal was approved by the Brisbane City Council in May 2011, with the store opening in January 2014.

The stretch between Queen Street and Elizabeth Street holds other well known luxury brands, with super-luxury Australian jeweller Canturi having his only Brisbane salon in the Tattersalls Arcade, opposite French leather making Longchamp. Also in this stretch are Gucci and Australian luxury handbag maker Oroton, which re-opened their flagship Brisbane store in late 2012.

The corner of Edward Street and Elizabeth Street is particularly prestigious. Hermes operate a two-storey flagship on the corner of Edward St and Elizabeth St, diagonally opposite Omega, will open a flagship in late 2018 at this intersection. Tag Heuer also operate a store on that corner, while Cartier operate its largest Australian store on the remaining corner spot, taking two levels of a heritage building. 171 Edward Street, a proposed skyscraper, was originally planned to be built at this corner and would’ve been one of Brisbane’s tallest buildings if built.

In late July 2012 Mont Blanc opened their new boutique next to Hermes, after closing their Queens Plaza store. In December 2012, Singapore-based luxury timepiece retailer The Hour Glass opened their fourth Australian store on Edward Street, next to Mont Blanc. In April 2013 Ermenegildo Zegna opened a two-storey boutique on the street. Other stores in the vicinity include Italian menswear specialist Canali, Brisbane-based menswear department store Mitchell Ogilvie, and Australian menswear specialist The Cloakroom.

== Gallery ==
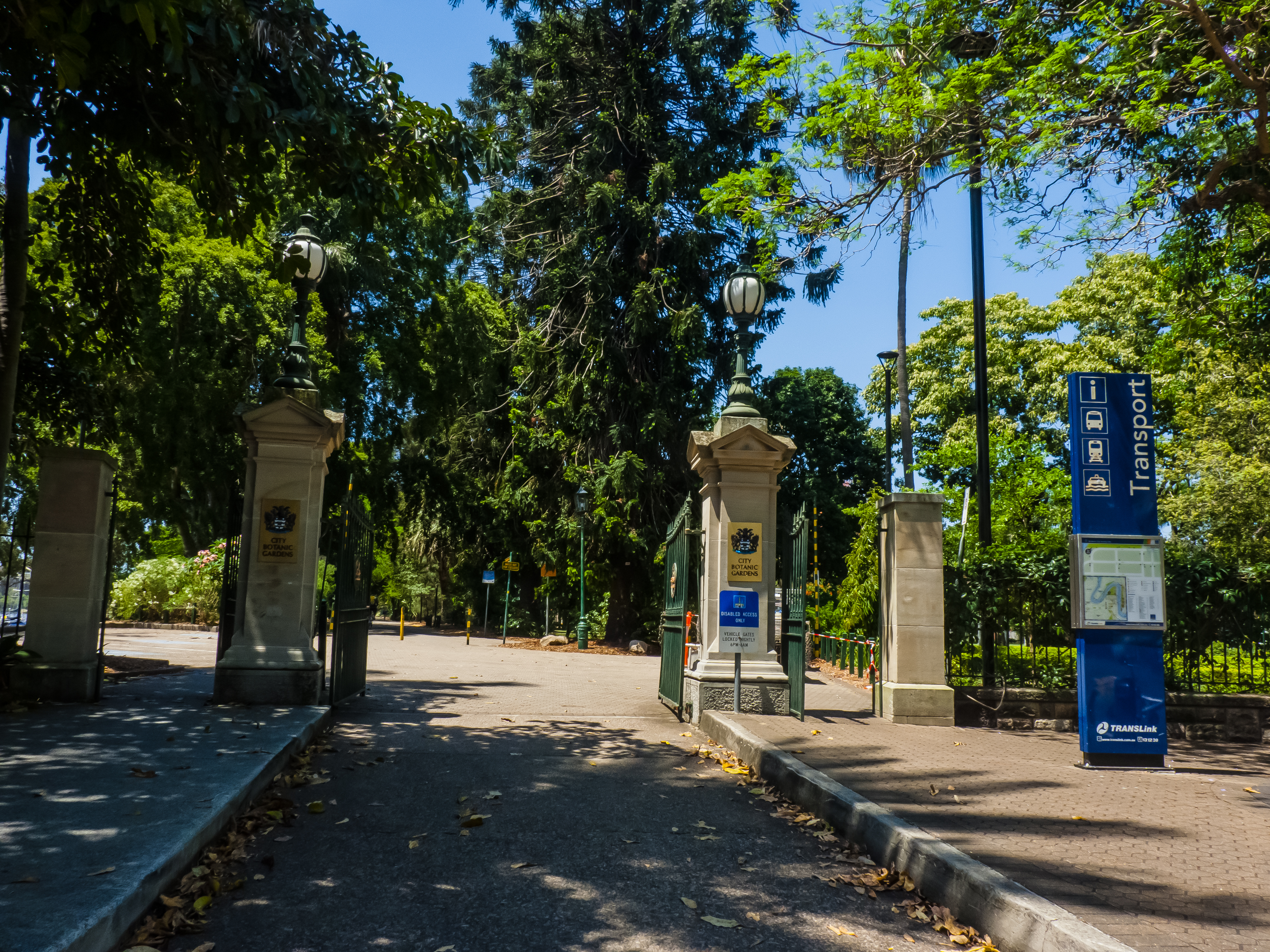
Edward street gates

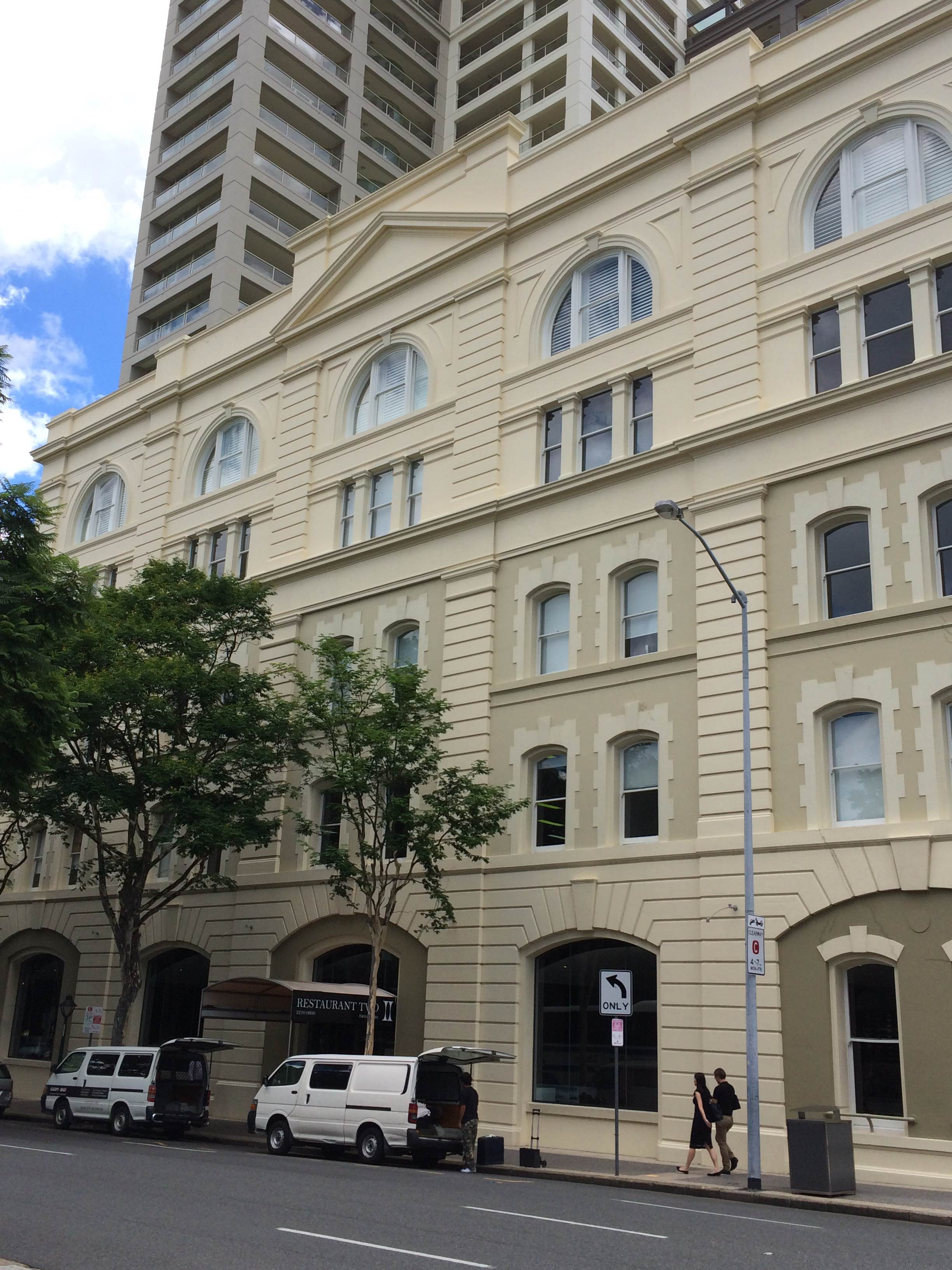
Old Mineral House

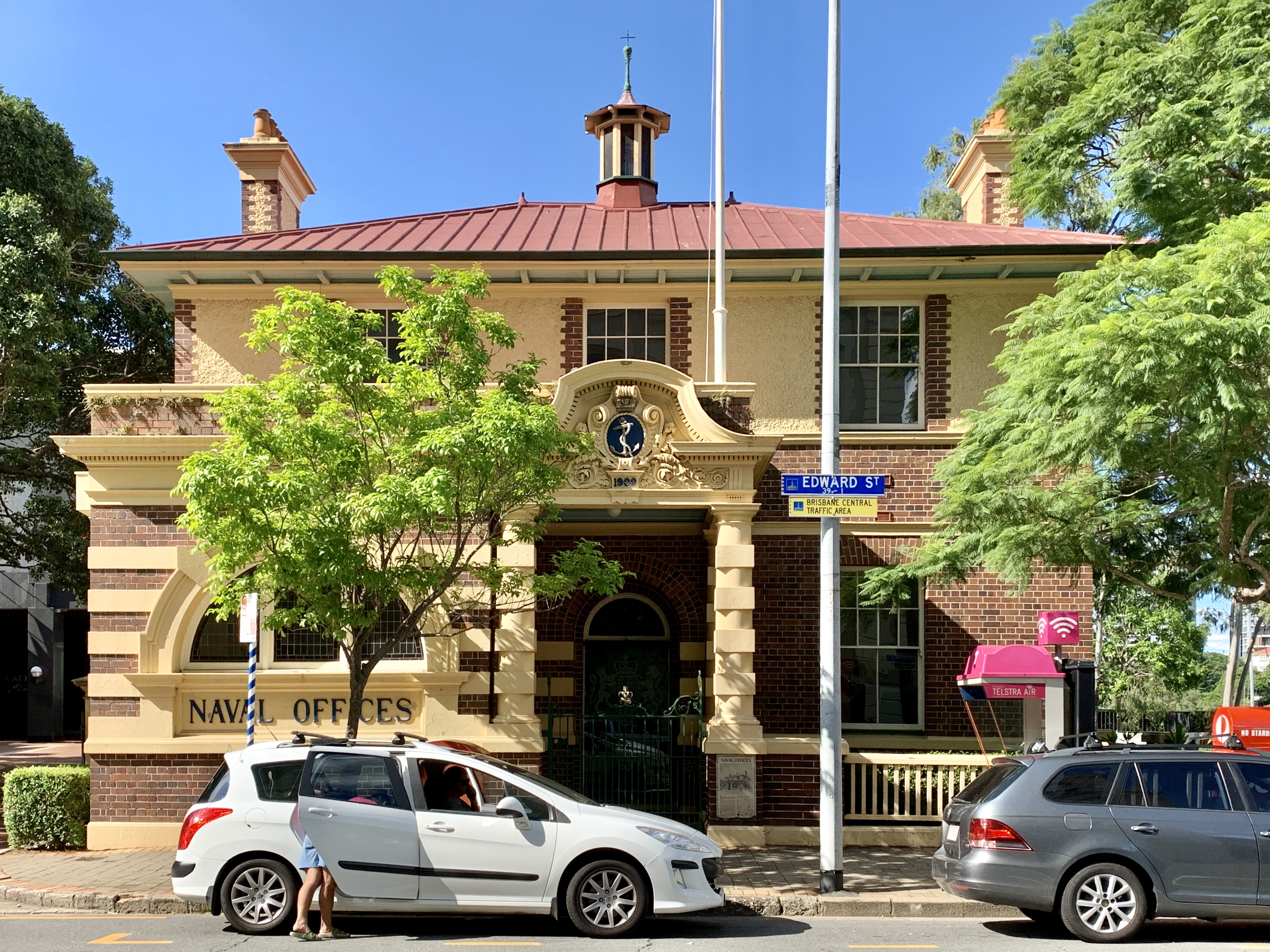
Naval Offices

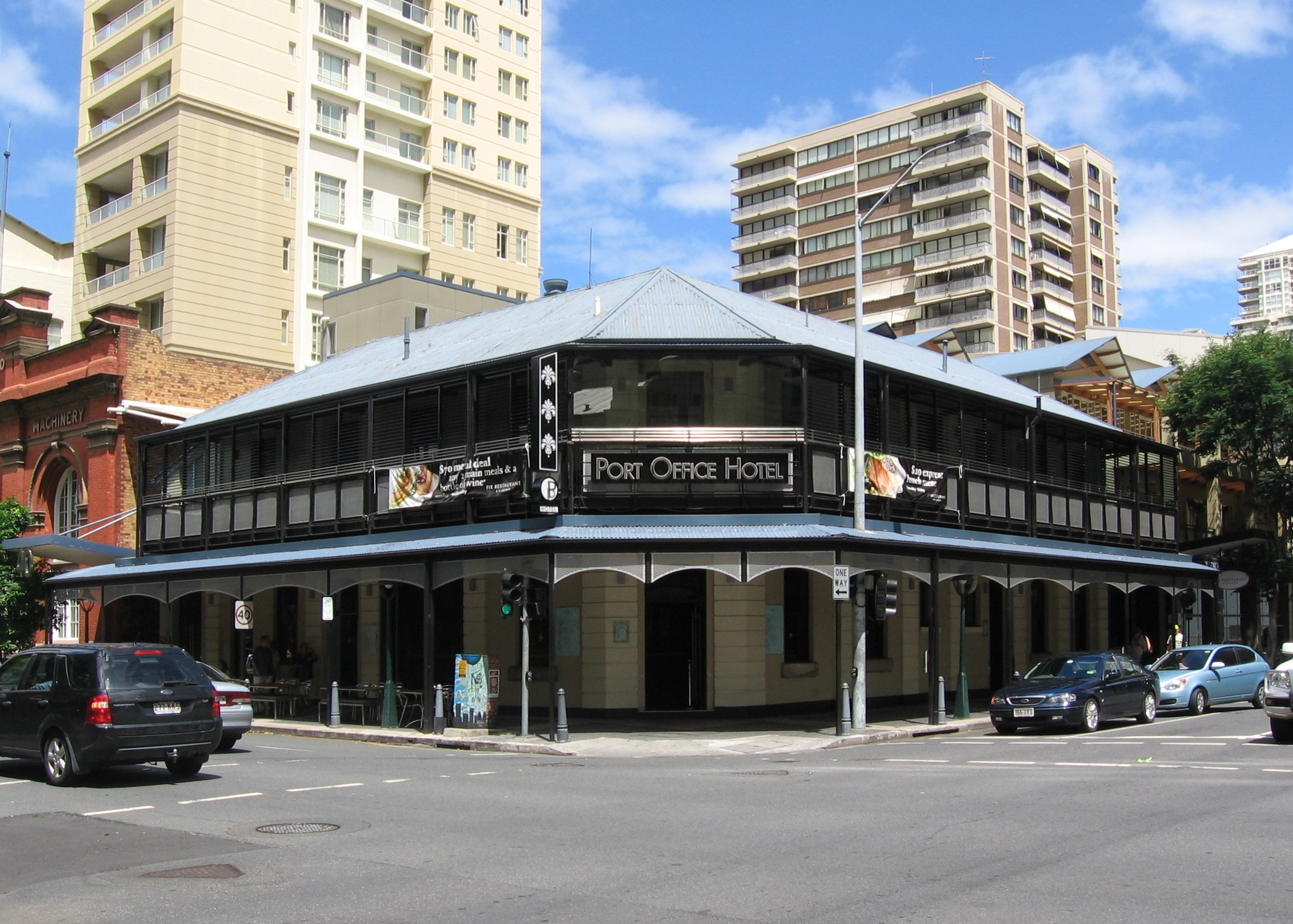
Port Office Hotel

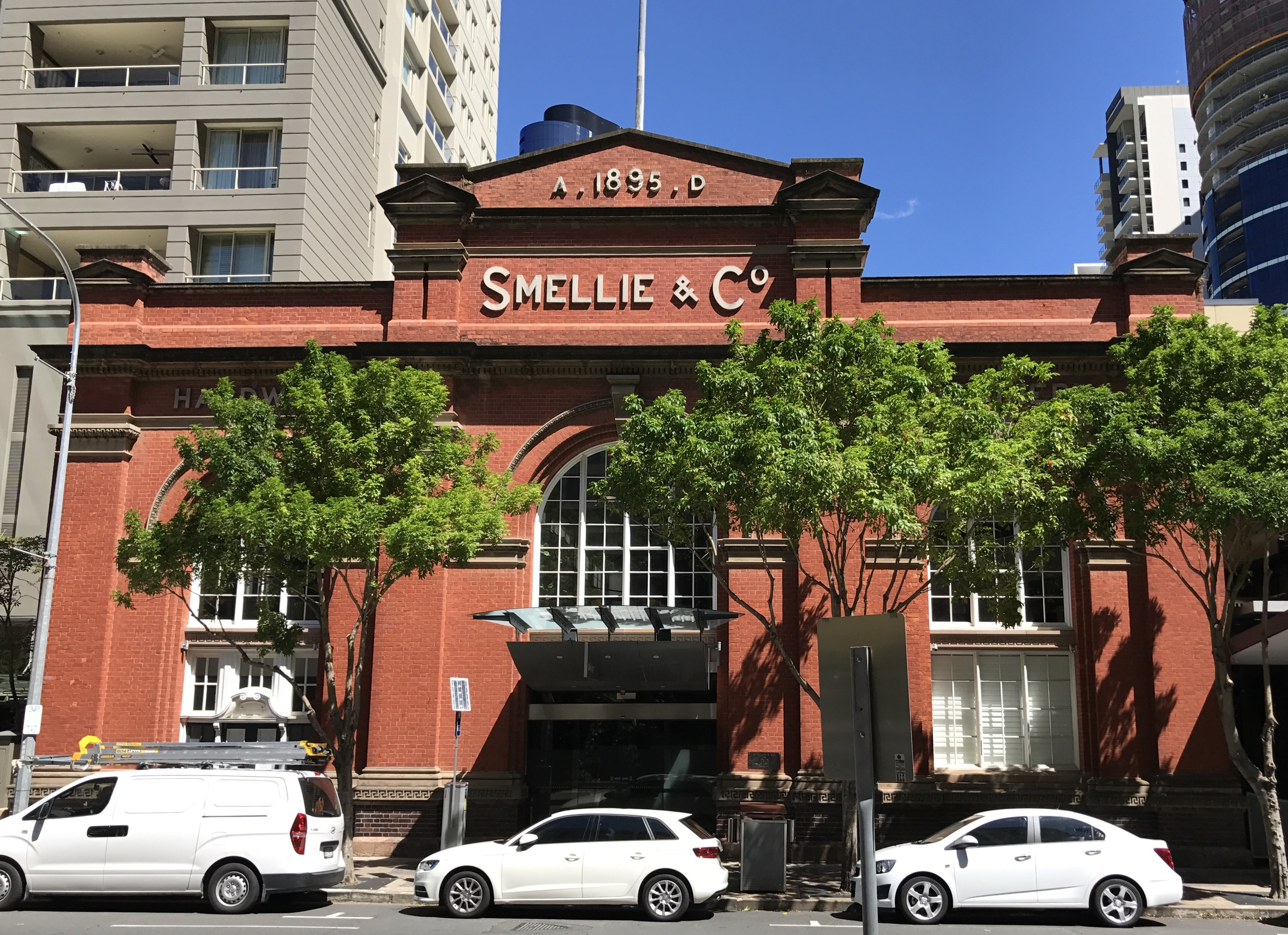
Smellie's Building

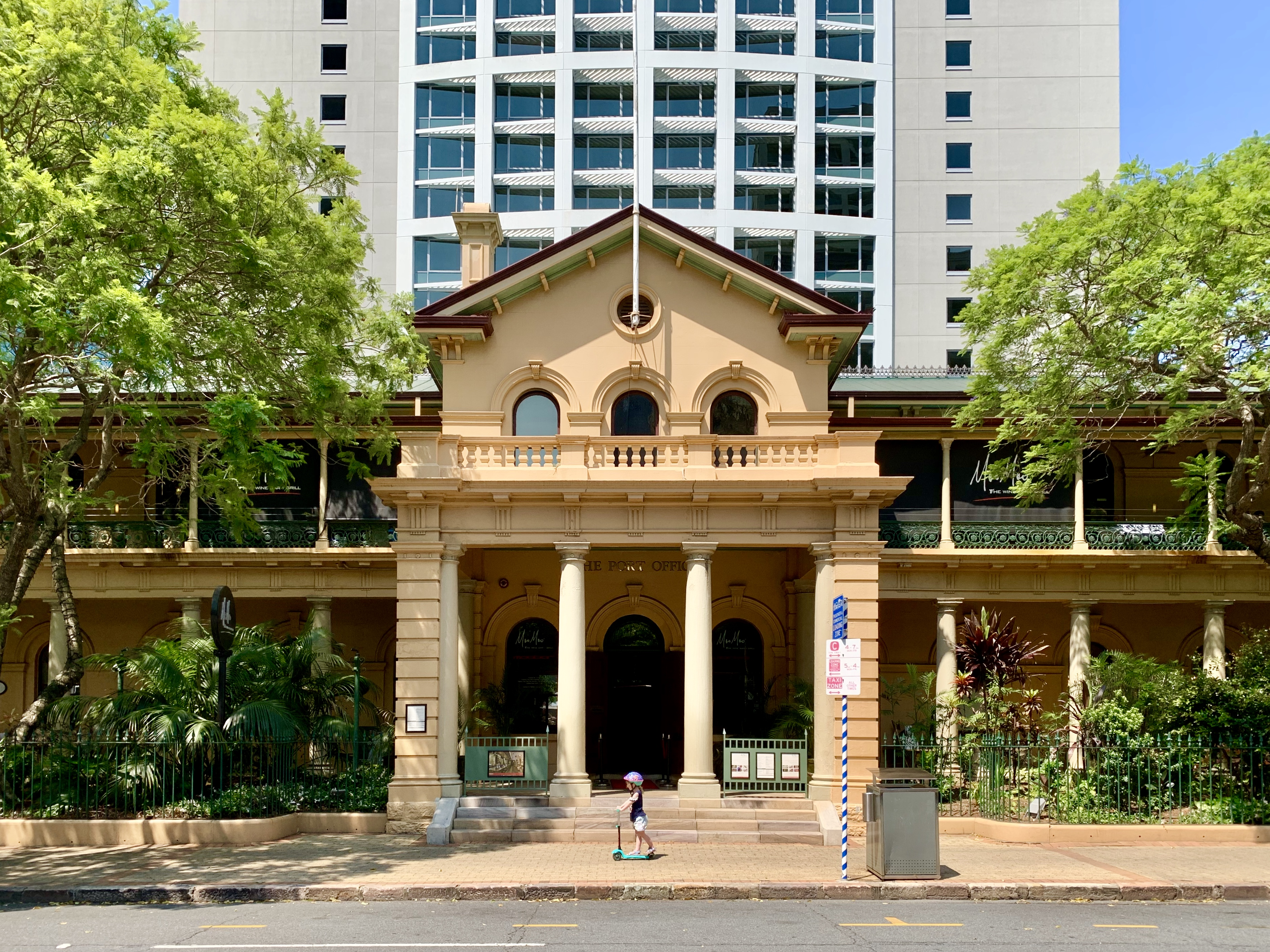
Port Office

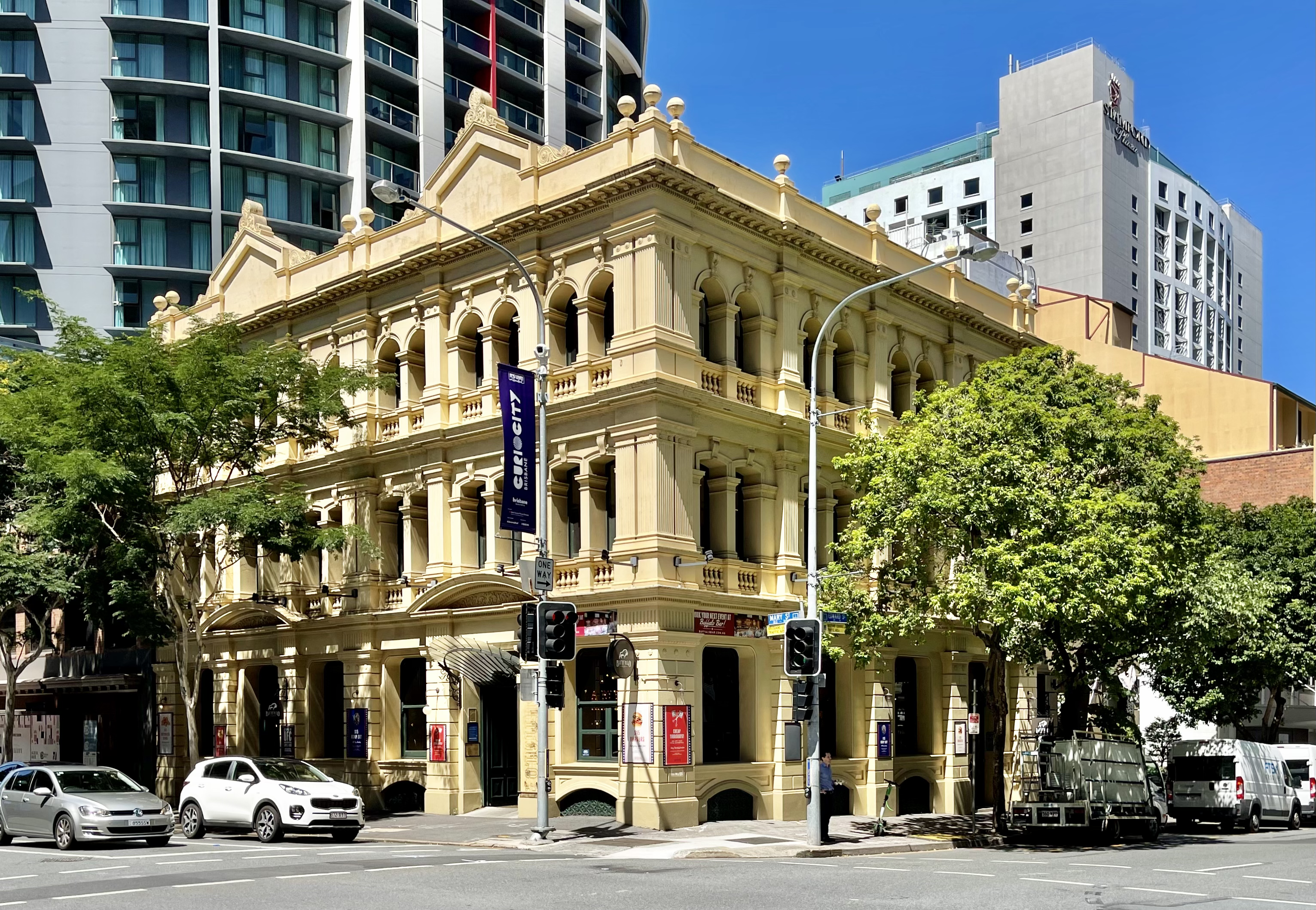
169 Mary Street

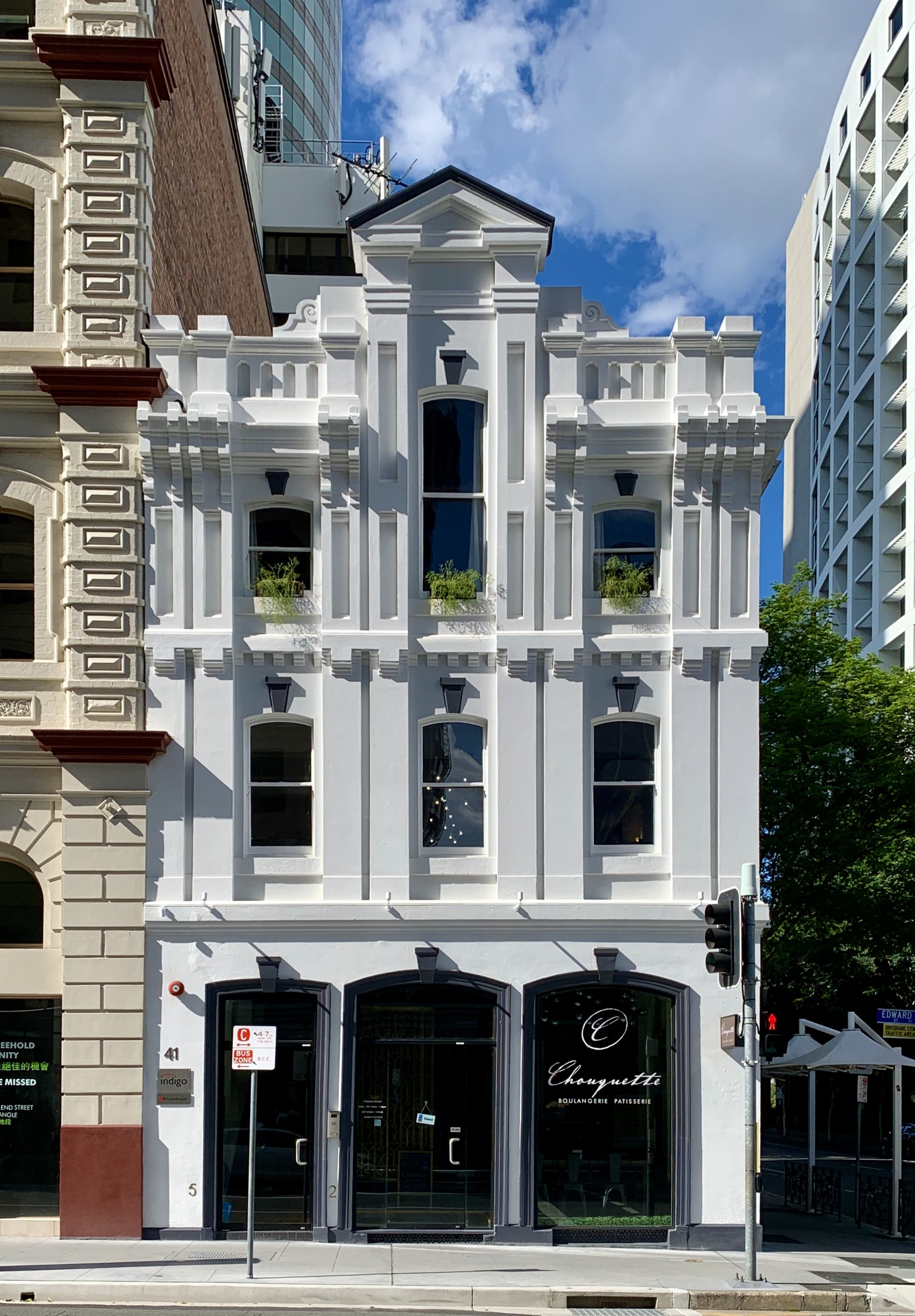
R Martin & Co Building

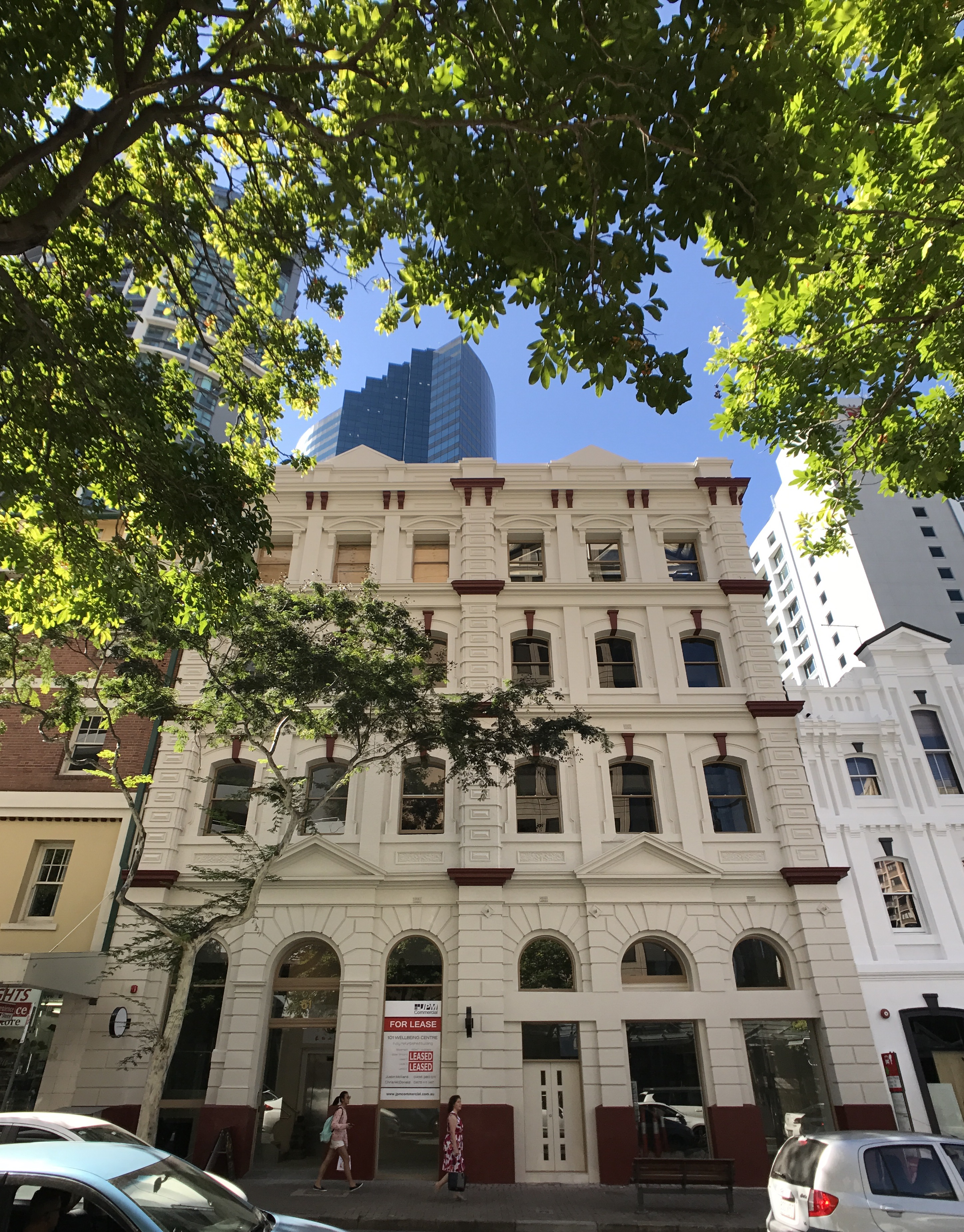
Spencers Building

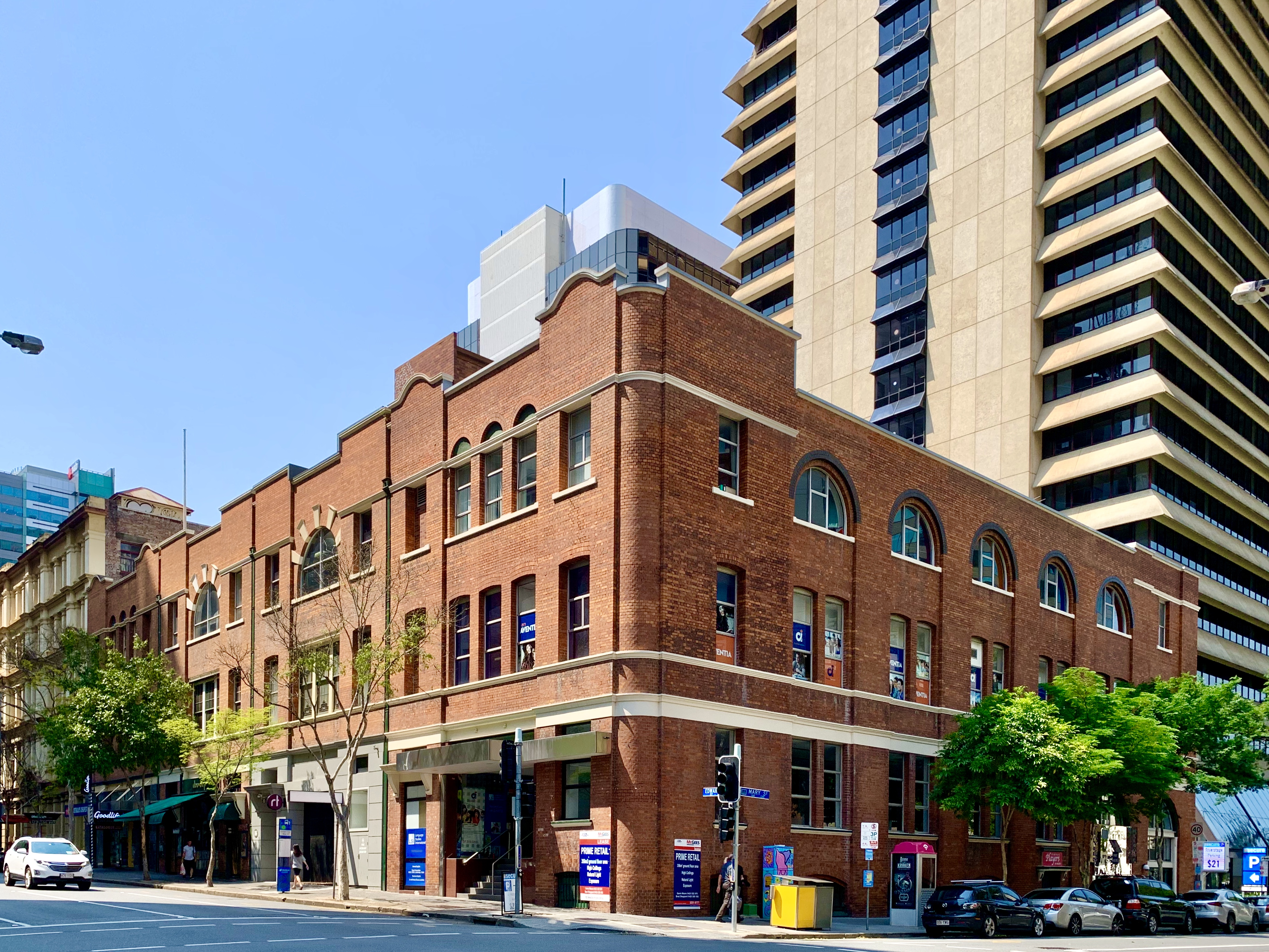
Youngs Building

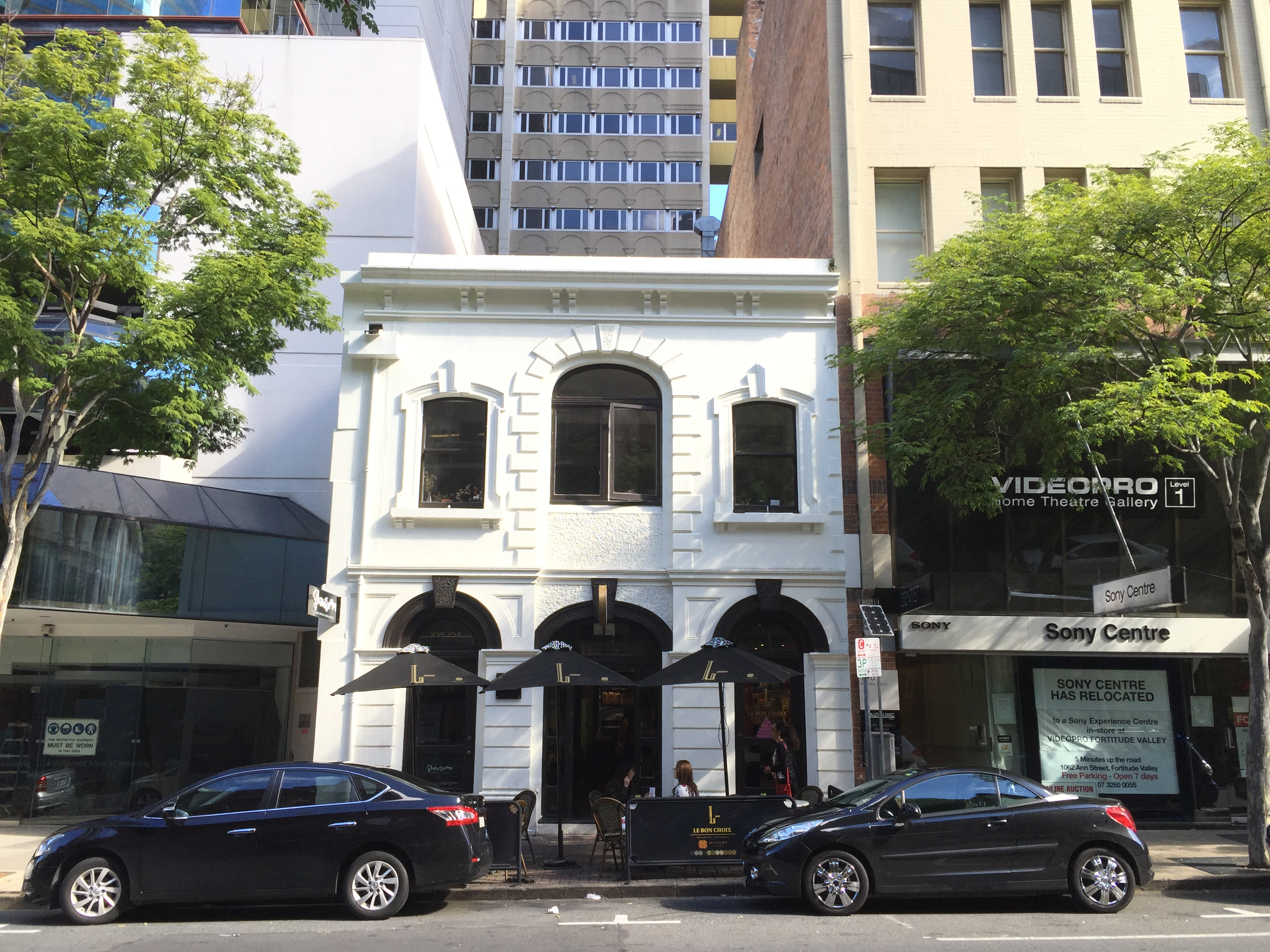
102 Edward Street

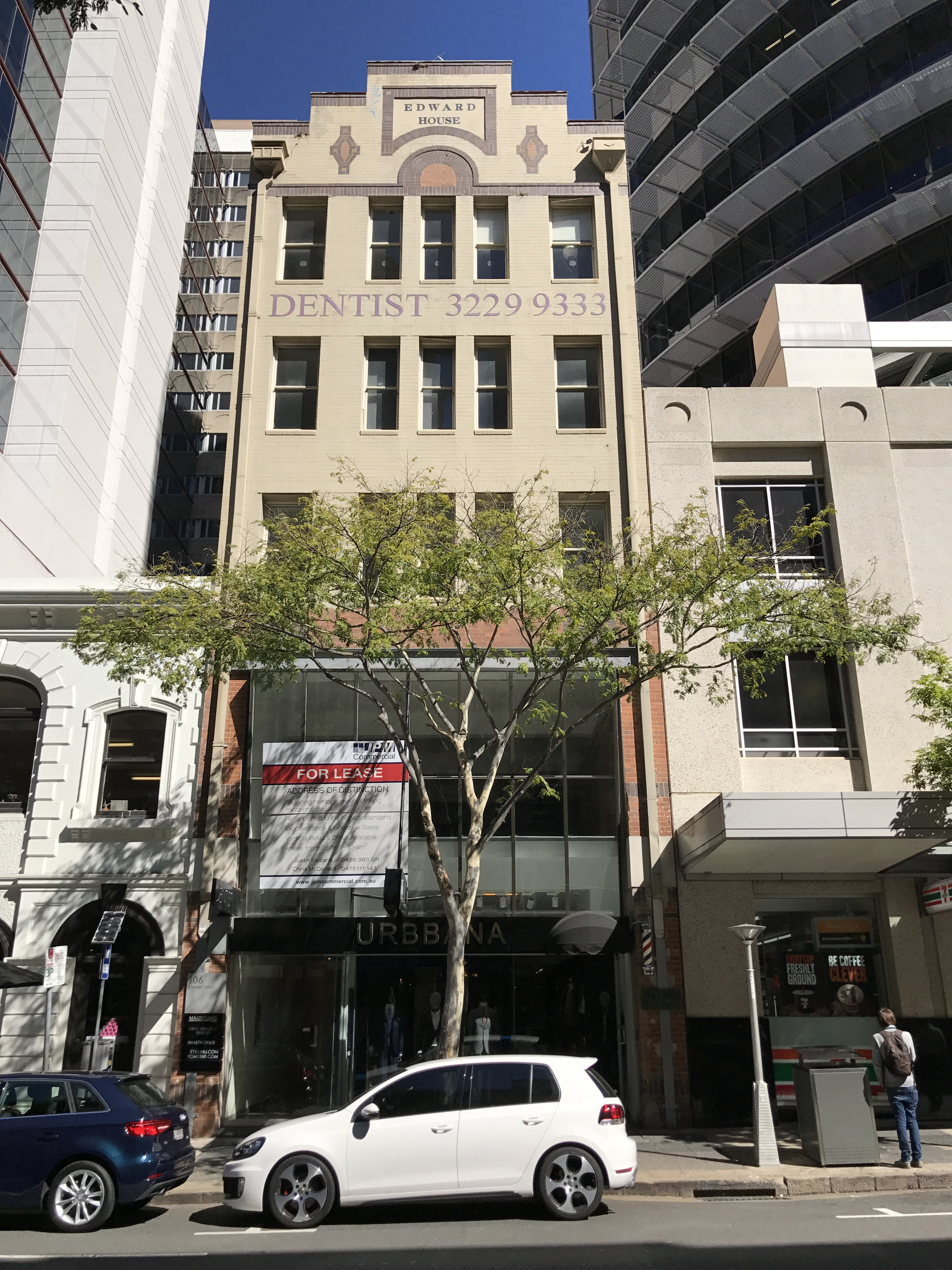
Edward House

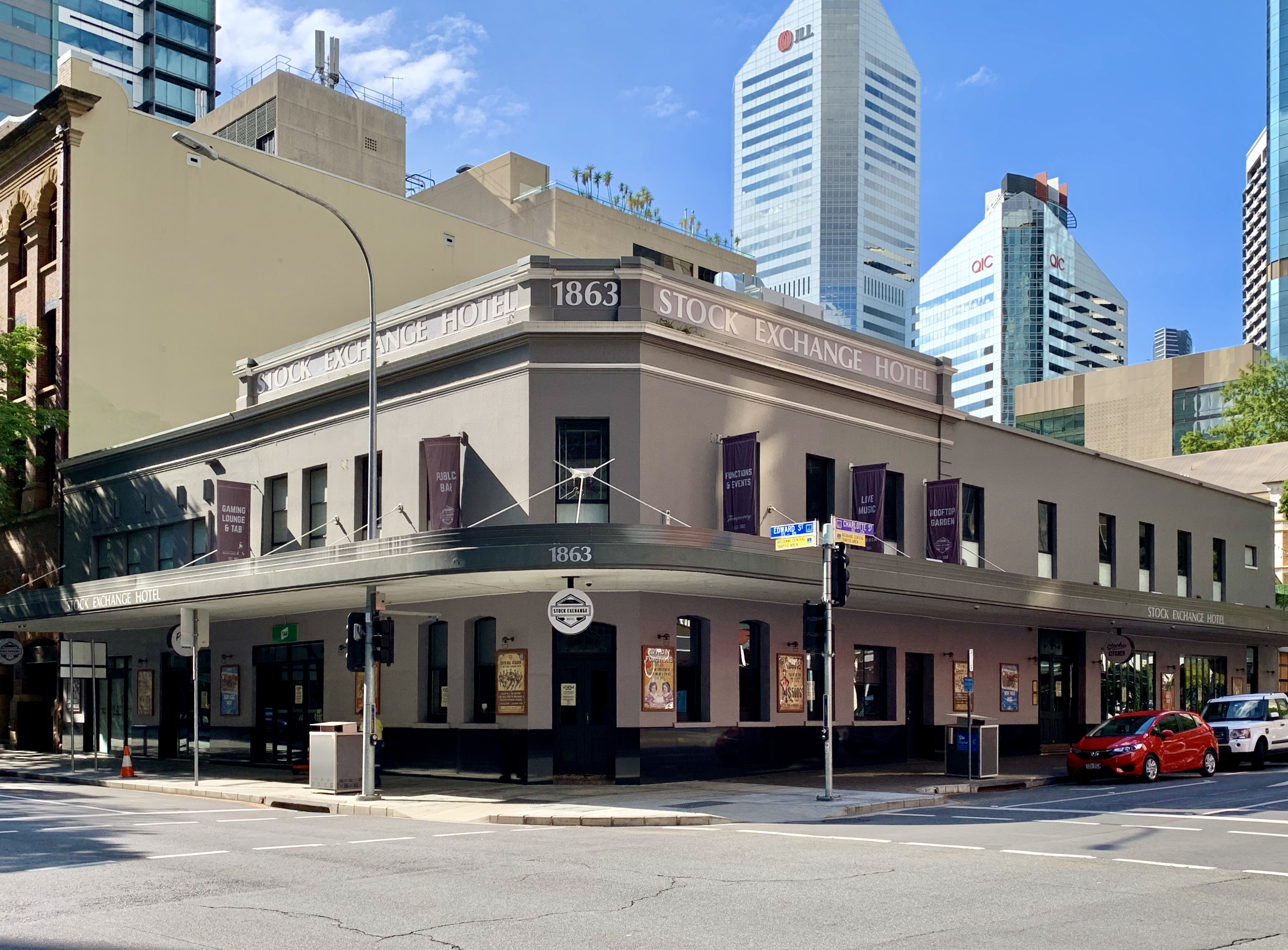
Stock Exchange Hotel

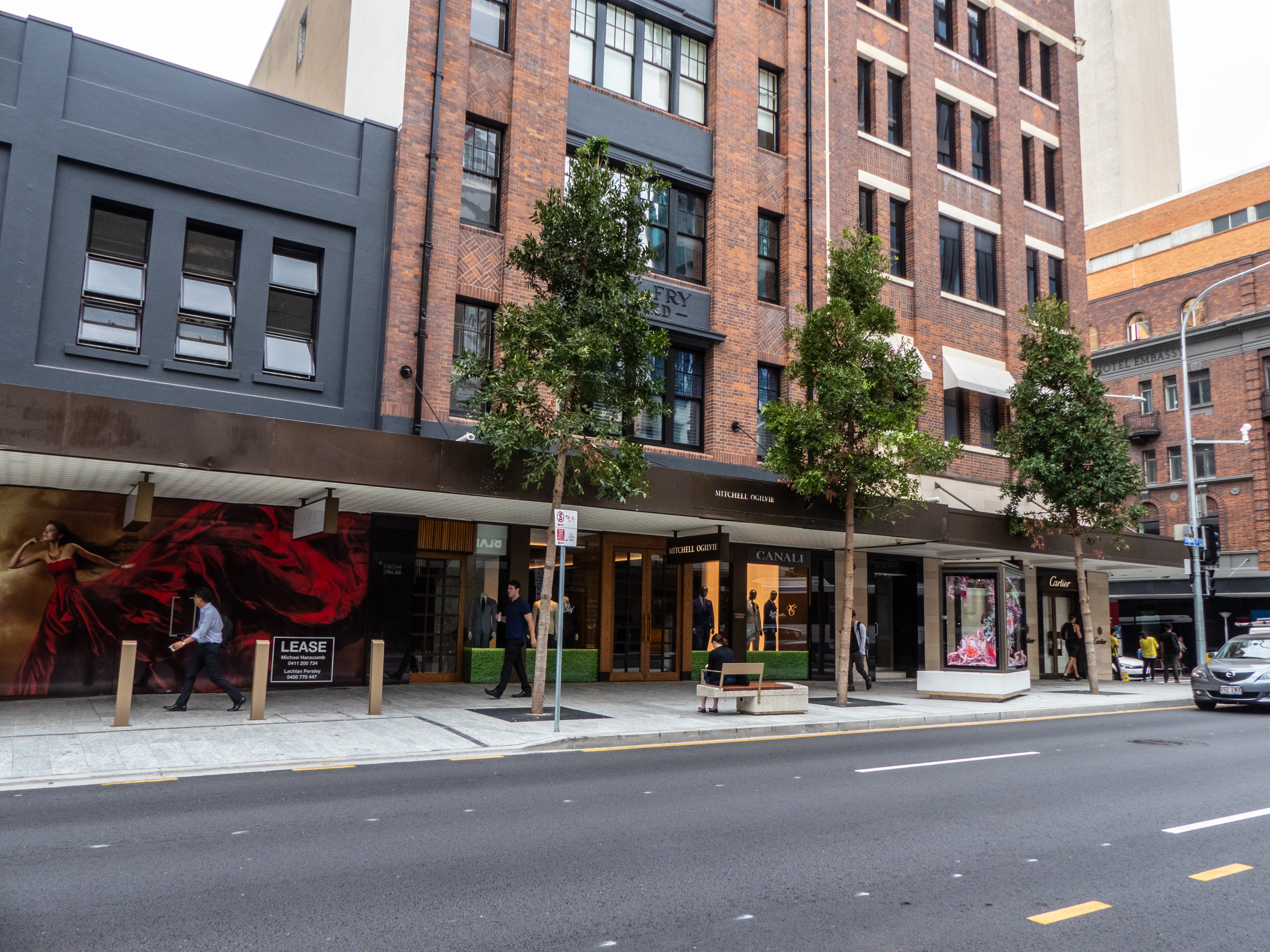
Invicta House

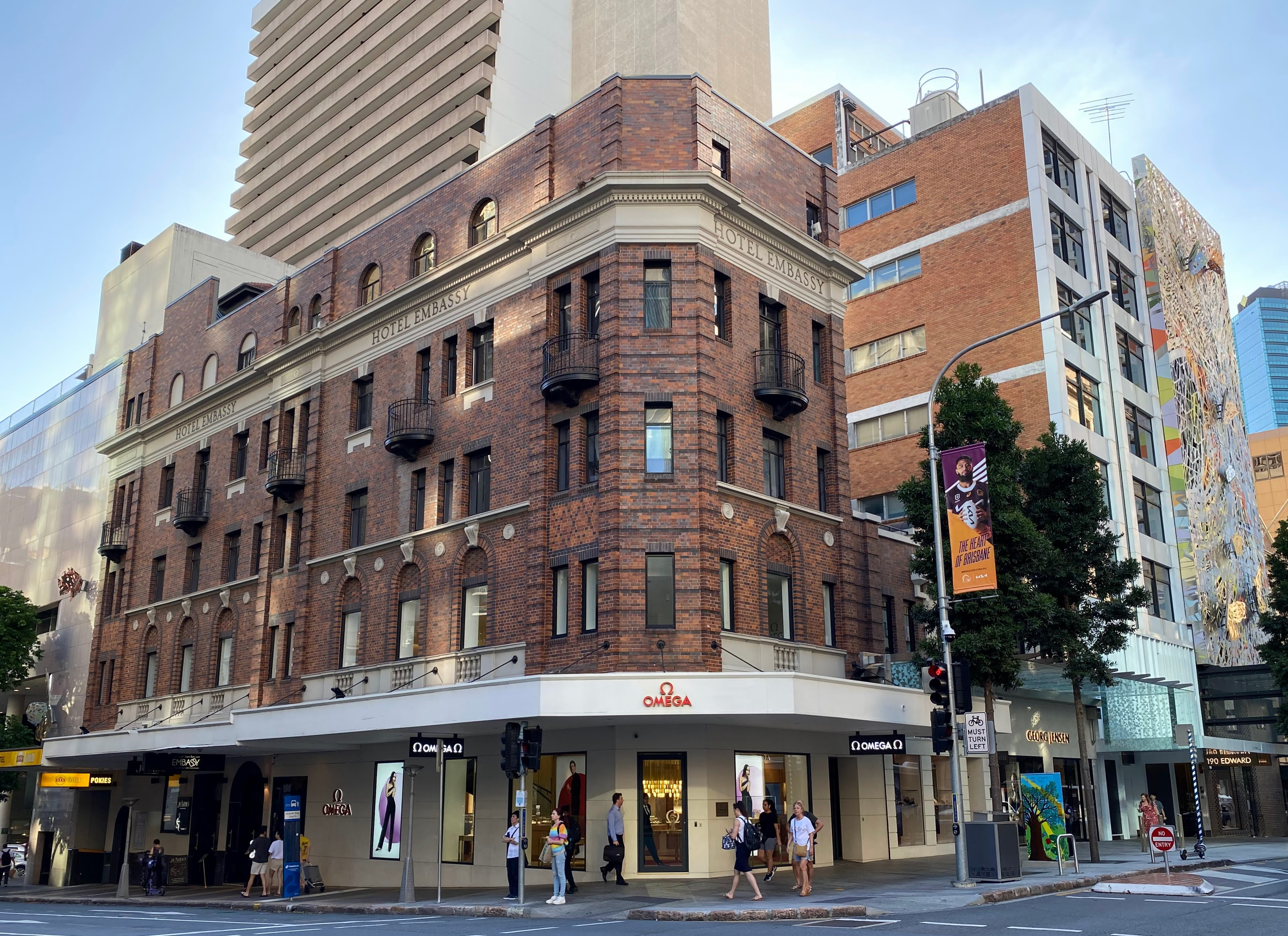
Hotel Embassy

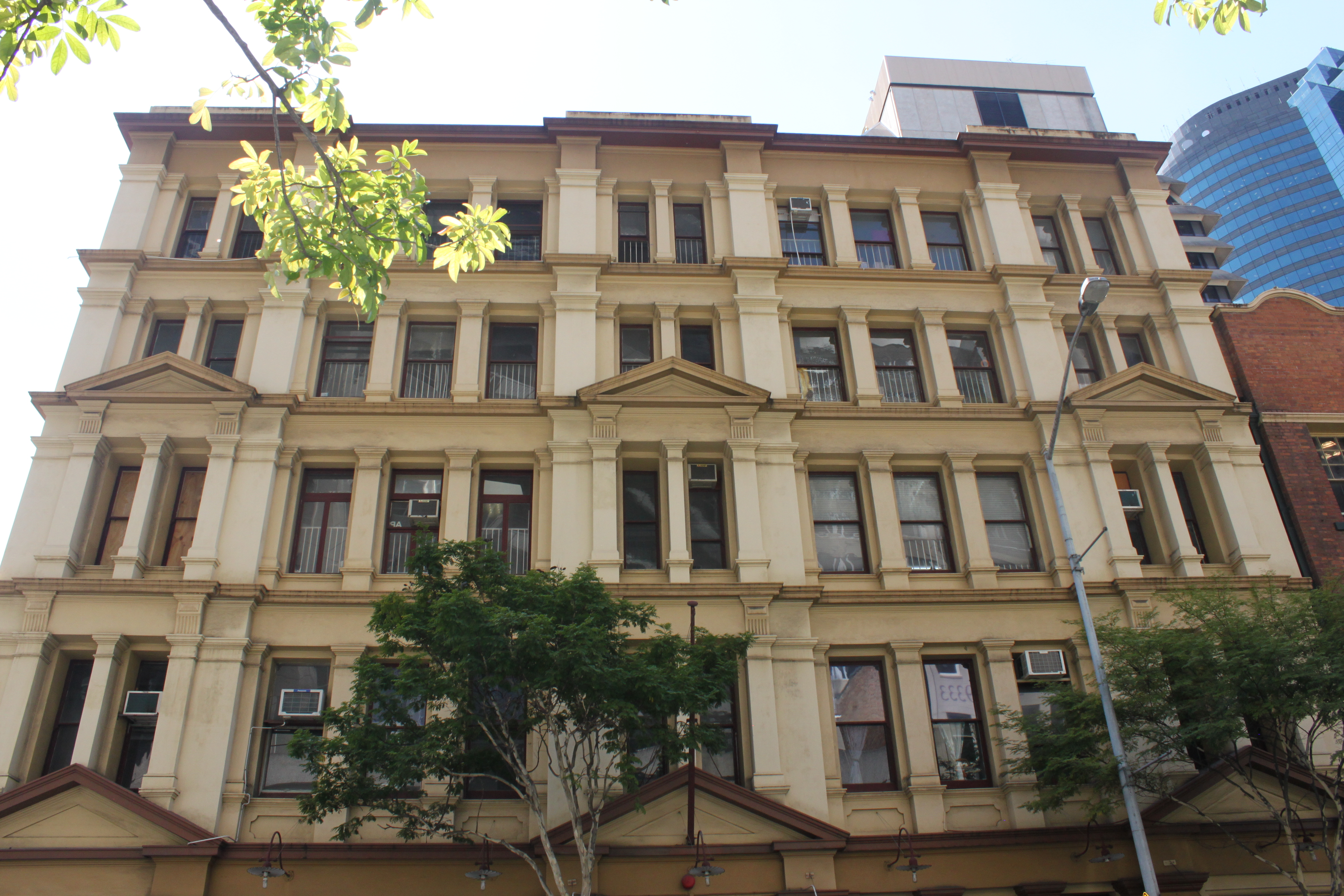
Metro Arts Theatre

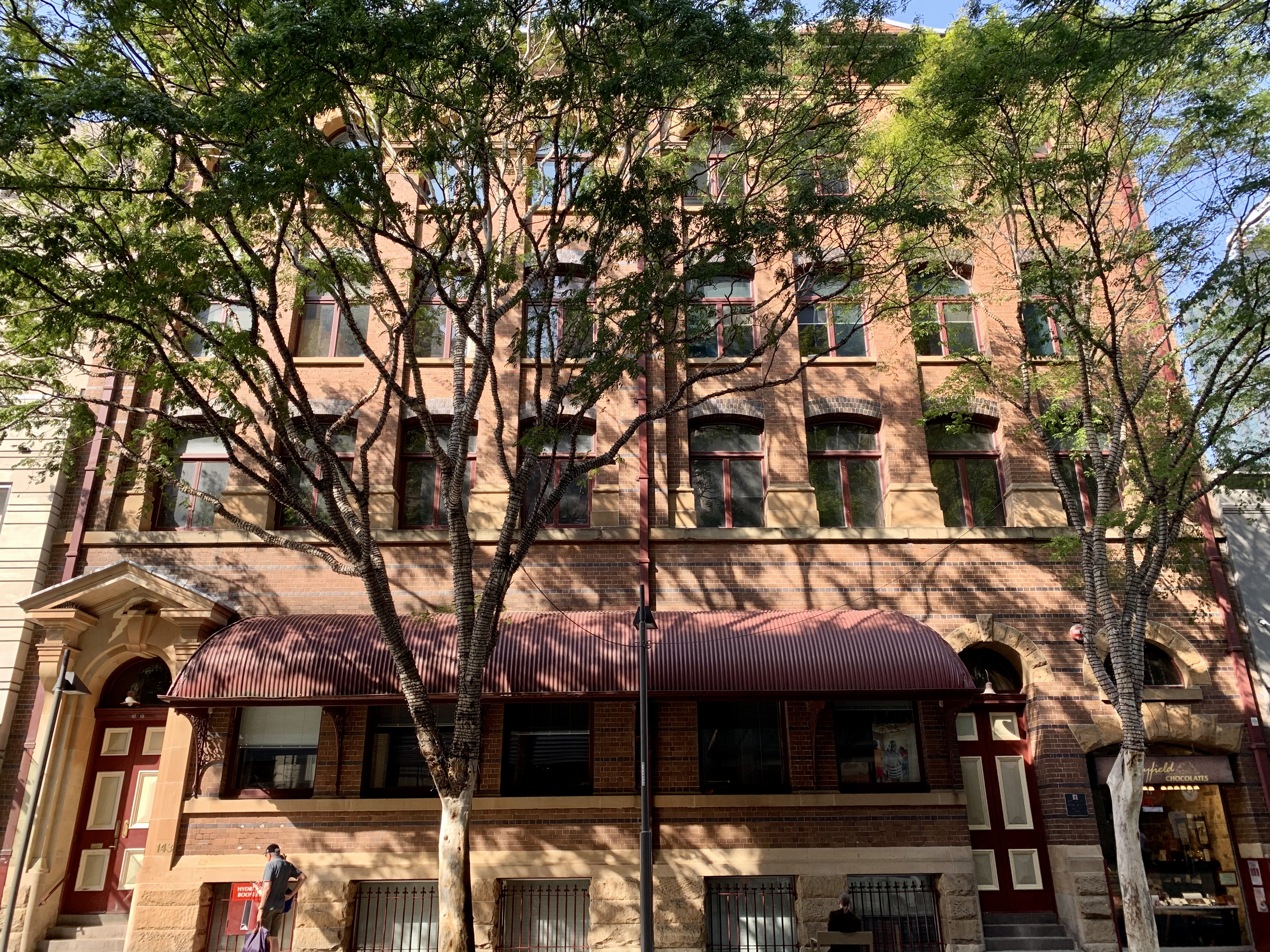
Catholic Centre

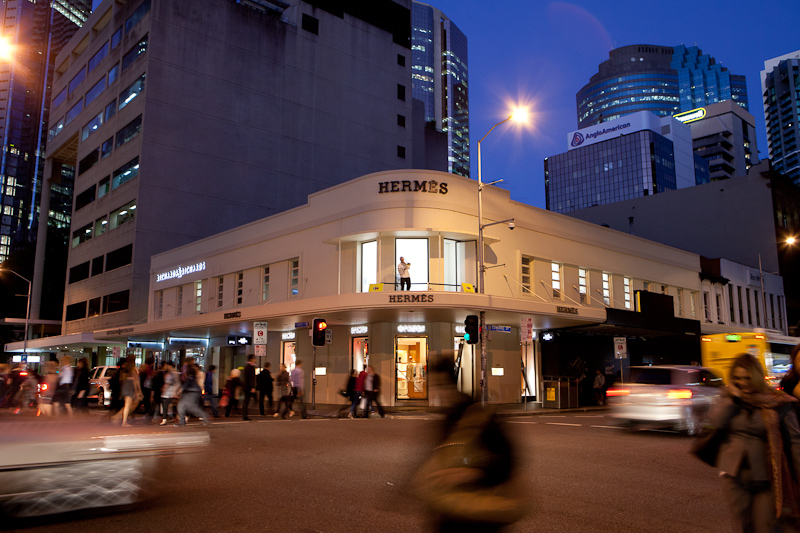
171 Edward Street

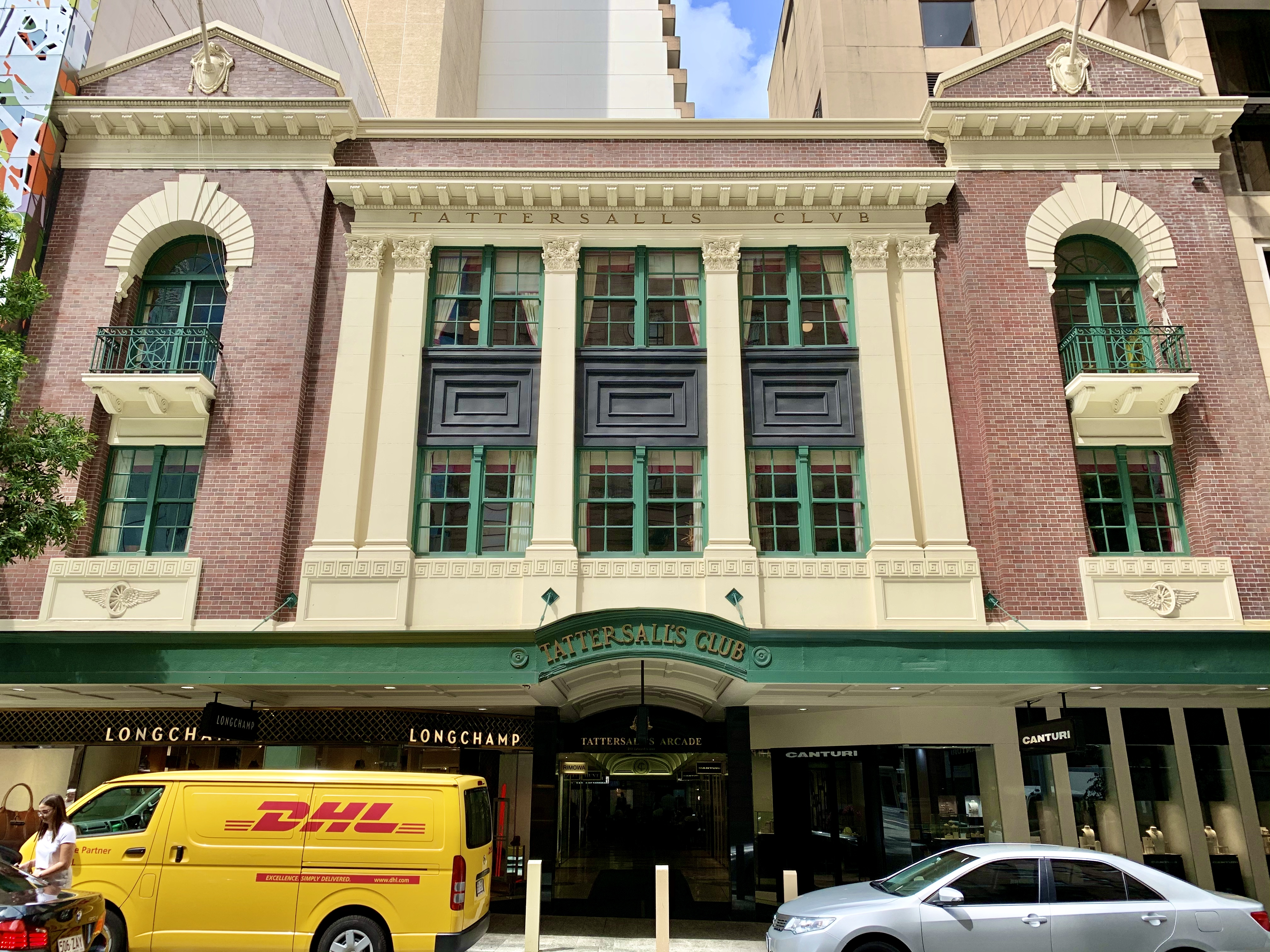
Tattersalls Club

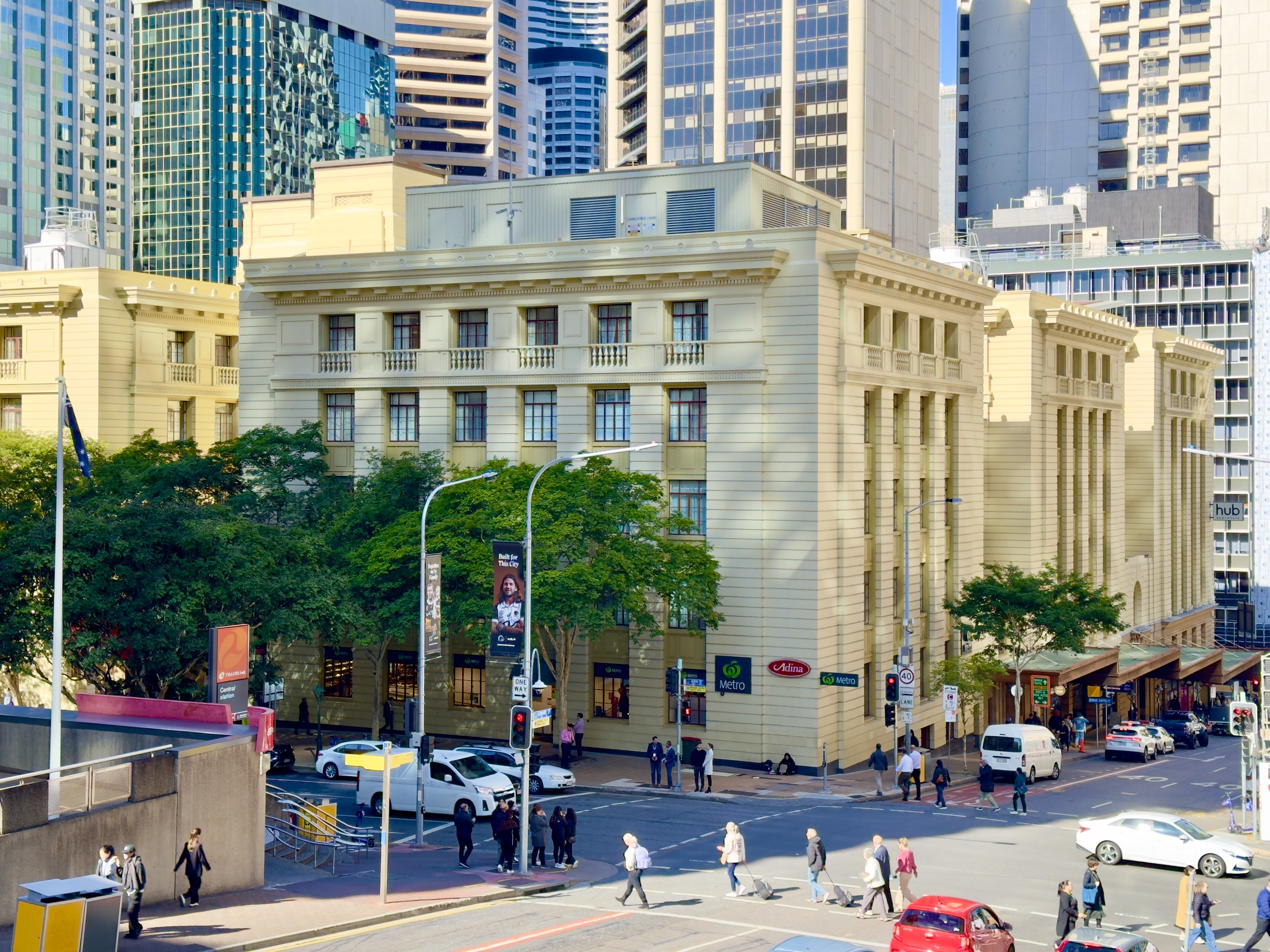
Anzac Square Building

== Major intersections ==
- Alice Street
- Margaret Street
- Mary Street
- Charlotte Street
- Elizabeth Street
- Queen Street
- Adelaide Street
- Ann Street
- Turbot Street
- Wickham Terrace

== See also ==
- 144 Edward Street, Brisbane
