= 171 Edward Street, Brisbane =

Residential skyscraper in Brisbane, Queensland

171 Edward Street
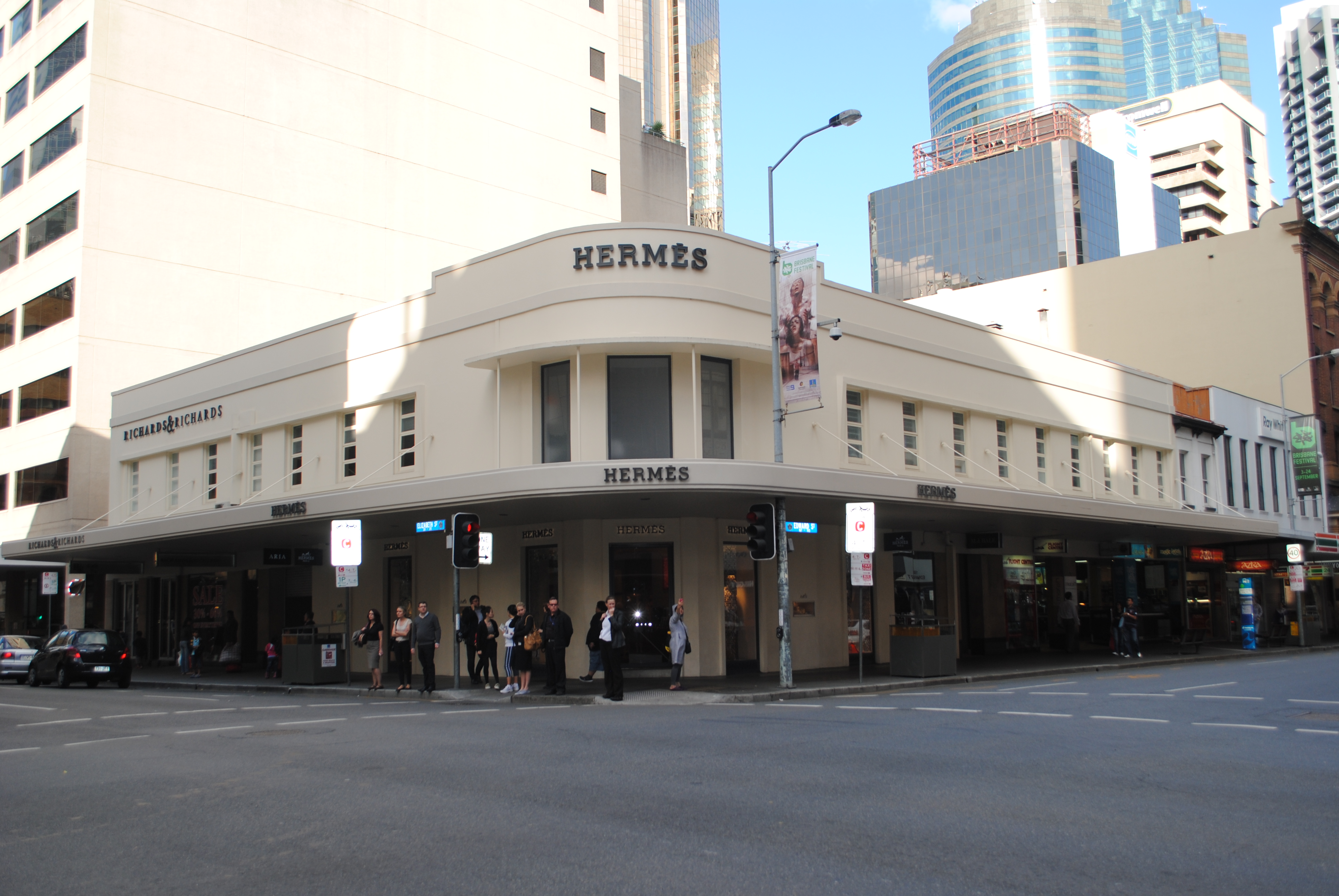
- Current building
- Alternative names: 155 Edward Street

General information
- Status: Never built
- Type: Residential
- Location: Brisbane, Queensland, Australia, 171 Edward Street
- Coordinates: 27.469114°S 153.0279°E
- Cost: A$270 million
- Owner: The Hour Glass Group

Height
- Roof: 265 metres (869 ft)

Technical details
- Floor count: 81

Design and construction
- Architecture firm: Rothelowman
- Developer: Aria Property Group (Former); Dexus (Former)

171 Edward Street was a proposal for a residential skyscraper to be located at the address of the same name on the corner of Edward and Elizabeth Streets in Brisbane, Queensland, Australia. The tower would have risen to a height of 265m (274m AHD) which is currently the maximum allowable height in the Brisbane central business district.

The 81-storey tower would have included 642 apartments; 313 one-bedrooms, 219 two-bedrooms, and 110 three-bedrooms. Recreation areas with a pool, gymnasium and games room would have been located across levels 4 and 5. Retail space was also planned for the ground floor and mezzanine level.

A development application, lodged with the Brisbane City Council in December 2015, was approved in May 2016. As of 2019, approval for the building was set to expire in June 2020. Aria's commercial manager Michael Zaicek allegedly told Commercial Real Estate that they "have no intentions for a residential development in the near future".

Property developer Dexus acquired the site in 2019 for A$87m. In 2022, Dexus sold the site to a Singapore-listed company, the Hour Glass Group, for A$82.2m. As such, it may be inferred that the original plan has been put on indefinite hold, if not cancelled.

== See also ==
- List of tallest buildings in Brisbane
