= Youngs Building =

Heritage-listed building in Brisbane, Queensland

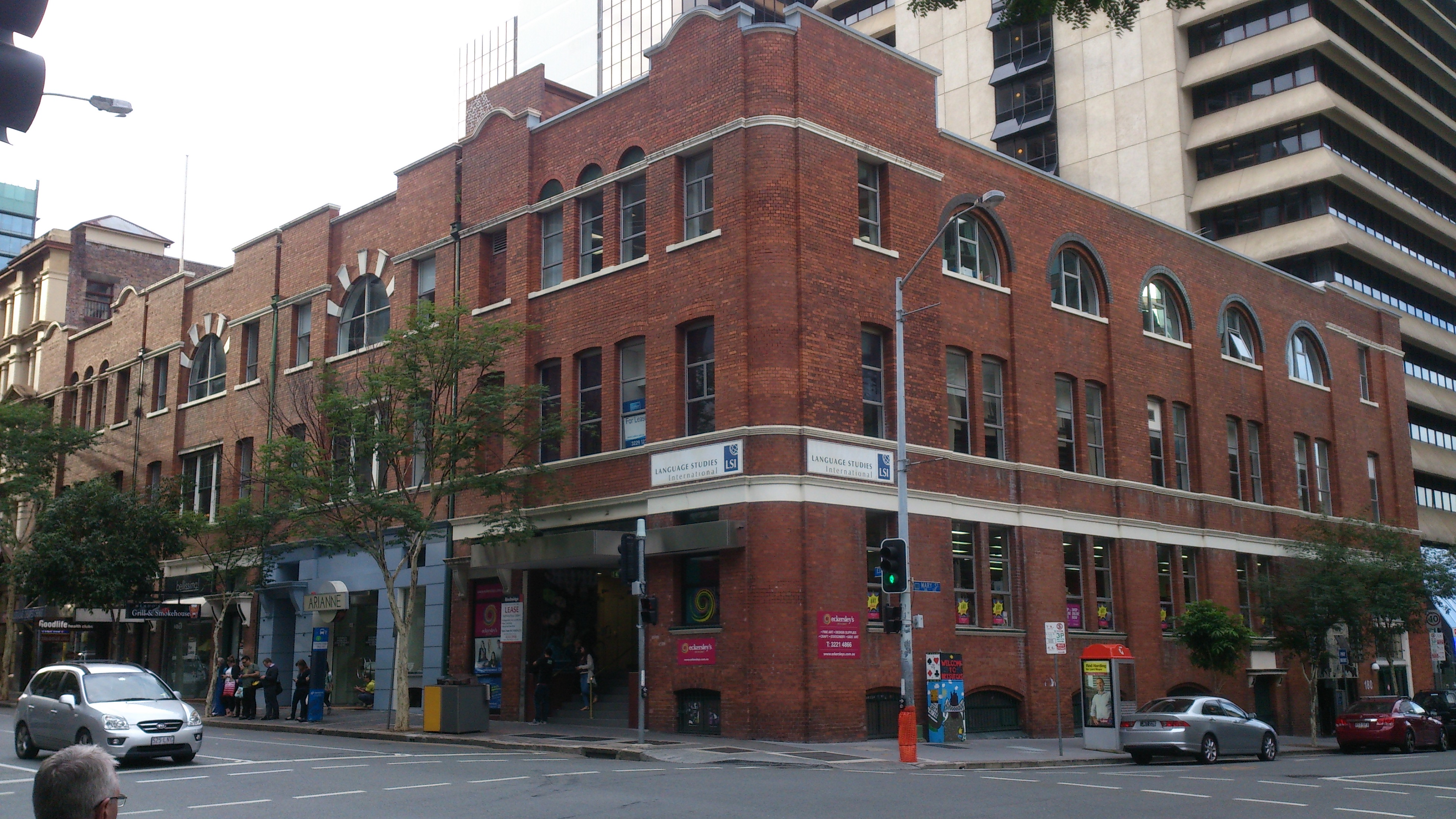
- Youngs Building in June 2015

- Location within Queensland Location within Australia
- 27.4702°S 153.0292°E
- Location: 93–103 Edward Street, Brisbane City, City of Brisbane, Queensland, Australia

History
- Design period: 1900–1914 (early 20th century)
- Built: 1910, repaired 1912

Queensland Heritage Register
- Official name: 93–103 Edward Street, Optical Products, Youngs Building
- Type: state heritage (built)
- Designated: 22 February 1995
- Reference no.: 600102
- Significant period: 1910, 1912 (fabric); 1910–1923 (historical)
- Significant components: tank stand

Youngs Building is a heritage-listed warehouse at 93–103 Edward Street (corner of Mary Street), Brisbane City, City of Brisbane, Queensland, Australia. It was built in 1910 and repaired in 1912. It is also known as Optical Products. It was added to the Queensland Heritage Register on 22 February 1995.

== History ==
This building was constructed in 1910. Recognising the investment potential of this warehouse precinct, Horace Edwin Broughton Young and Charles Ernest Young purchased the site of the Commercial Hotel for redevelopment in July 1909. The Young family founded the Fairymead Sugar Company Limited in 1879 which by 1912 was one of the largest mills in the Southern Hemisphere. The timber framed brick warehouse constructed on this site in 1910, at a cost of £16,000, was three storeys high, with a basement, and a fourth storey on the corner section. The building was leased the same year to Queensland Agency Company (merchants), Kronheimer Ltd (tobacco and cigar merchants) and Gregory and Davidson (merchants and arrowroot manufacturers). On 30 April 1912 fire broke out in the corner section of Youngs Building, occupied by the Queensland Agency and caused considerable damage to parts of the building and much of the stock kept on the premises. The fourth floor collapsed and was never rebuilt, leaving the repaired building three storeys throughout.

In 1923 the property was subdivided. Subdivision 1 was acquired by W.D. & H.O. Wills (Australia) Ltd (tobacco merchants) and John Simon Goldman and Ernest Victor Goldman, warehousemen, purchased subdivision 3. After Horace Young's death in December 1925, the remaining subdivisions were sold to Taubmans (Qld) Ltd and Arthur Cocks and Co, merchants. Change of ownership occurred in 1968 and subsequently the building has provided office space for numerous commercial tenants.

== Description ==
This Federation era warehouse shows many characteristics of the type with its fine detailing and unrendered brickwork. From Edward Street the building can be divided visually into four bays of equal width. The two central ones being identical to each other and the two outer bays while different to these are essentially the same as each other. Each of the four bays is symmetrical, with two narrow raised sections to either side with a slightly higher parapet, and a broader recessed central section between them. A continuous line of string coursing runs around the building across the face of the bays at the ground floor ceiling level, the first floor sill level and the second floor head level. This upper coursing is broken in two places at the recessed portions of the two central bays where there is a broad arch with voussoirs expressed alternately in render. The recessed portions of the outer bays have three tall rectangular windows on both the upper levels. Located above the string course over each top-level window is a small brick arched opening. The outer bays also have raised semicircular sections of parapet centred at the top of each raised narrow section. Many of the openings on all levels have also had their glazing replaced with modern windows using aluminium window frames. One of the central openings at the first floor level features leadlight window panes.

The corner of the building has a section of brick wall that curves onto the Mary Street facade. This facade has a raised portion near the corner with a single opening on each level. The building then continues back in the manner of one of the recessed portions on the front of the building with broad arches at the upper level but with paired windows below rather than a group of three. As the ground drops away at this corner, openings to the basement appear at footpath level.

The facade retains its original face brickwork and rendered decoration, although considerable changes have occurred to the window openings and types. Internally, some evidence of the original structure and finishes remains, particularly the pressed metal ceilings to the first floor of the left hand bay. A brick water tank support tower exists at roof level at the rear of the building.

== Heritage listing ==
Youngs Building was listed on the Queensland Heritage Register on 22 February 1995 having satisfied the following criteria.

The place is important in demonstrating the evolution or pattern of Queensland's history.

The building is important in demonstrating the pattern of Queensland's history, in particular the evolution of lower Edward Street as a commercial/warehousing precinct and of the upsurge in the building industry in the early twentieth century.

The place is important in demonstrating the principal characteristics of a particular class of cultural places.

The building demonstrates the principal characteristics of a federation era warehouse with its broad arches and finely detailed face brick facade.

The place is important because of its aesthetic significance.

The building exhibits particular aesthetic characteristics valued by the community, including the length of its facade which contributes to the streetscape of Edward Street.
