= 144 Edward Street, Brisbane =

Skyscraper in Brisbane, Queensland

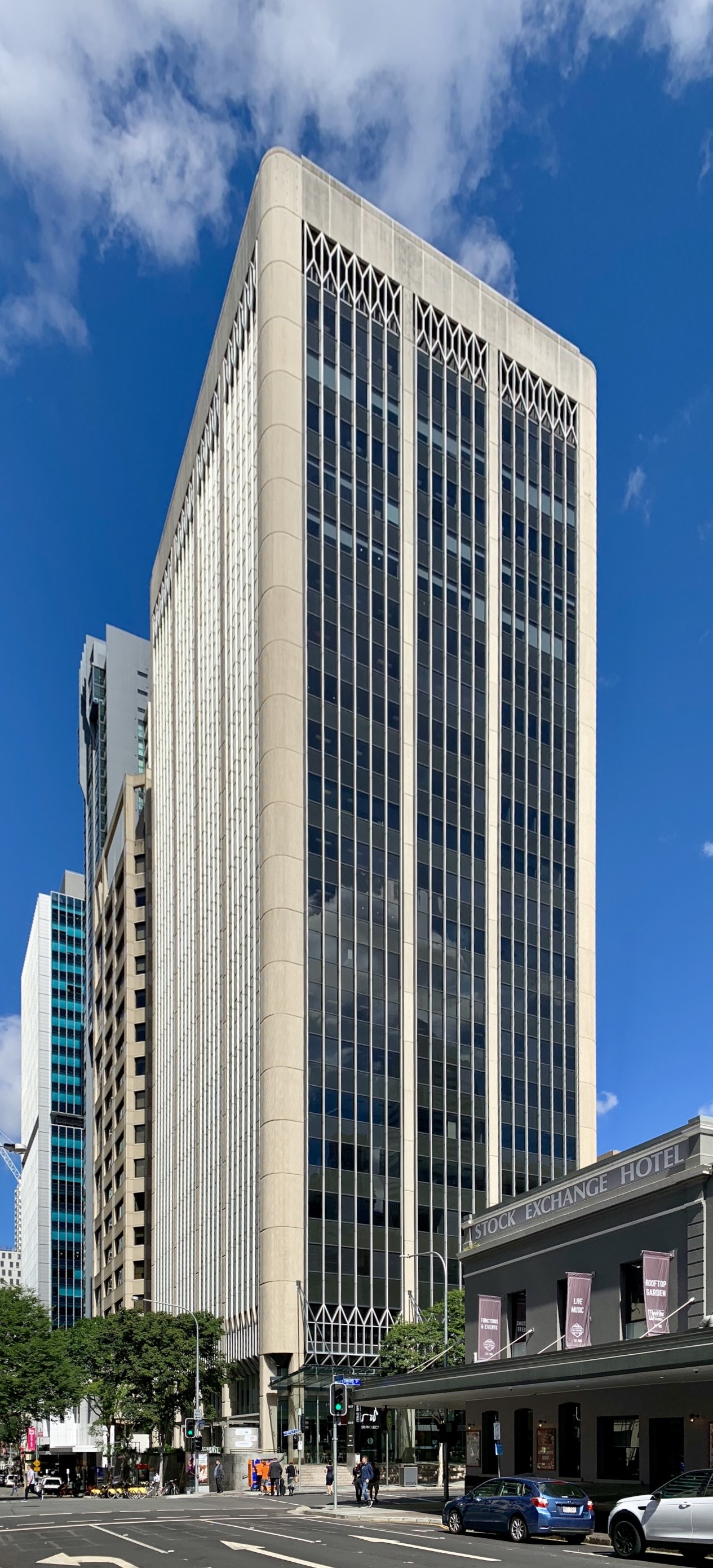
- 2018
- Interactive map of the 144 Edward Street, Brisbane area

General information
- Type: Office Tower
- Location: 144 Edward Street, Brisbane
- Coordinates: 27°28′11.5284″S 153°1′40.7784″E
- Current tenants: Amec Foster Wheeler, Senex Energy, AGL Energy (anchor tenants)
- Completed: 1982
- Owner: Precision Group
- Management: Precision Group

Website
- www.144edward.com.au

144 Edward Street, Brisbane is a high-rise office tower located on the corner of Edward and Charlotte streets in the Brisbane central business district, Queensland, Australia. The tower was designed in 1978 and constructed in 1980 as the National Mutual Centre, successively renamed the Axa Australia Centre and 144 Edward Street, Brisbane, is now owned by the Precision Group. It stands now at 82 meters, covers 16,097 square metres, 26 floors (above ground) and 75 car parks spread on two basement levels.

== History ==
In the late 1970s, National Mutual appointed Conrad Gargett & Partners Architects, Connell Hagenbach structural engineers and Norman Disney & Young building services engineers, to design the tower in the late 20th century International Style and named it the National Mutual Centre upon completion in 1980. Then, National Mutual moved to 144 Edward Street during the height of the battle between National Mutual and AMP for dominance of the Australian life insurance market. In 1999, Axa took control of the National Mutual Centre [1][2] and renamed it Axa Asia Pacific. As a result, the tower became the Axa Australia Centre in Brisbane. Three years later, Deutsche Diversified Trust (DDT) acquired the building as part of the Deutsche Bank's acquisition of Axa Asia Pacific's property funds management enterprise in 2001. Finally, Precision Group purchased the tower from DDT for $44.65 million in 2002.
