= Rowes Building =

Heritage-listed building in Brisbane, Queensland

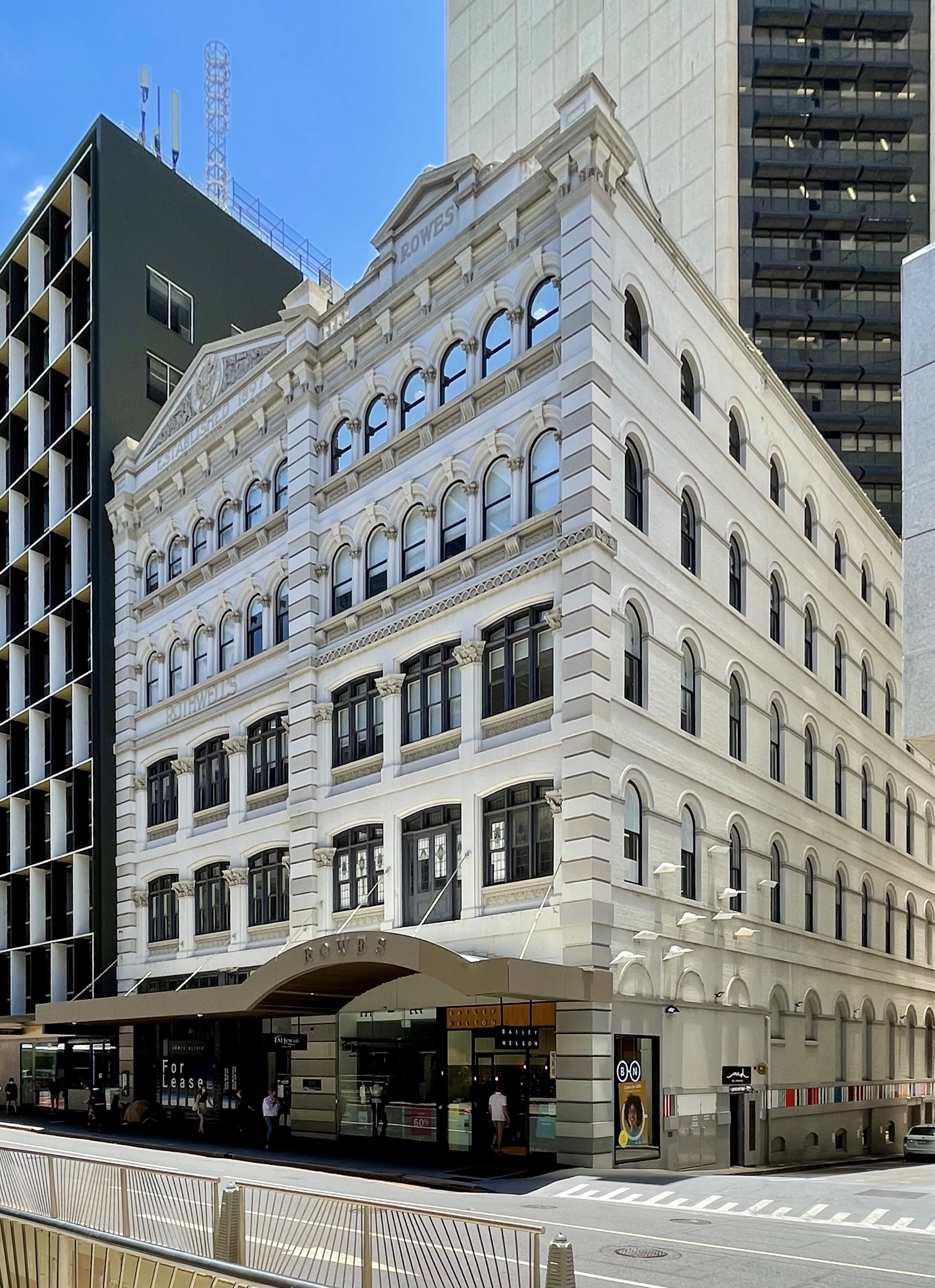
- Rothwells Building (left) and Rowes Building (right, arched entrance), 2021

- Location within Queensland Location within Australia
- 27.4677°S 153.0267°E
- Location: 235 Edward Street, Brisbane, Queensland, Australia

History
- Design period: 1870s–1890s (late 19th century)
- Built: 1885–1926

Site notes
- Architectural style: Classicism

Queensland Heritage Register
- Official name: Rowes Building
- Type: state heritage (built)
- Designated: 21 October 1992
- Reference no.: 600095
- Significant period: 1885, 1925–1926 (fabric)
- Builders: W Macfarlane

Rowes Building is an Australian heritage-listed office building at 235 Edward Street, Brisbane. It is also known as Rowes Arcade. It was built from 1885 to 1926 by W Macfarlane. It was added to the Queensland Heritage Register on 21 October 1992; the address on the heritage register is 221 Adelaide Street as the Rowes Building is on part of an L-shaped piece of land which has frontages onto both Edward and Adelaide Streets with Adelaide as the official address of the land.

== History ==
Rowes Building was erected in 1885 along with the adjacent Rothwells Building. These buildings were erected together for their respective owners, Thomas MacDonald-Paterson and John Forsyth. MacDonald-Paterson was a solicitor and also served as a Member of Parliament. The buildings cost £13,000 to erect and the contractor for the project was W. Macfarlane. The ground floor was designed to be used as offices while the other floors were intended for either offices or warehousing.

Macdonald-Paterson took an office in his half of the premises and leased the remaining floorspace.

In 1903 William Effy signed a ten-year lease which covered the basement, ground floor and first floor balcony of the site. Effy, whose mother Minna Rowe had established the highly successful Rowes Cafe in Queen Street, continued the catering establishment at the new address and by 1909 the site contained a ground floor dining room with seating for 380 guests.

Effy purchased the building in 1914, and in 1925 he engaged architects Hall and Prentice to design major alterations and additions. The scheme, which cost £162,000, included the purchase of what was known as the City Garage, over which Rowes ballroom was built, and additional Adelaide Street frontage. The Adelaide Street building was demolished and a six storeyed building erected, the ground floor containing a shopping arcade (known as Rowes Arcade) with access to Rowes Cafe. The upper floors were divided into office accommodation. The T-shaped complex had its original frontage to Edward Street, but an increased depth to an approximate distance of 300 feet (91 m). Further alterations to the Edward Street facade were undertaken in late 1926.

In 1958 part of the original cafe was converted to an arcade of shops with extensions in 1961.Rowes passed into the ownership of National Mutual Life Association and a major redevelopment of the combined Rowes/Rothwells buildings took place in 1984.

== Description ==
Rowes Building is a five storeyed masonry building with a basement. The classical detailing of the front facade contains individual classical variants common in late Victorian commercial buildings. Most of this ornamentation is executed in plaster.

The lower floors have wide arched openings with wide flanking columns topped by decorative capitals. The windows on the upper floors have arched architraves with keystones and are separated by engaged columns with elaborate capitals. At the parapet level there is a cornice supported by bracketing, and centrally above this is a narrow pediment bearing the name "ROWES". The lower level shopfront has also been refitted and a first floor balcony removed. The laneway elevation is a simplified version of the street facade, with round-headed windows in an articulated brick wall.

Internally the timber trusses have been left exposed on the upper level and the French doors with lead lights which opened onto the first floor balcony remain.

The building is similar in design to the adjacent Rothwells Building.

== Heritage listing ==
Rowes Building was listed on the Queensland Heritage Register on 21 October 1992 having satisfied the following criteria.

The place is important in demonstrating the evolution or pattern of Queensland's history.

The Rowes Building is significant as it demonstrates the principal characteristics of an 1880s commercial building with an elaborate facade.

The Rowes Building is significant as it exhibits aesthetic characteristics valued by the community, in particular, it has a fine, classically detailed facade. Its form, materials and scale make a strong contribution to the Edward Street streetscape.

The place is important in demonstrating the principal characteristics of a particular class of cultural places.

The Rowes Building is significant as it demonstrates the principal characteristics of an 1880s commercial building with an elaborate facade.

The place is important because of its aesthetic significance.

The Rowes Building is significant as it exhibits aesthetic characteristics valued by the community, in particular, it has a fine, classically detailed facade. Its form, materials and scale make a strong contribution to the Edward Street streetscape.
