= Catholic Centre, Brisbane =

Heritage-listed building in Brisbane, Queensland

Catholic Centre
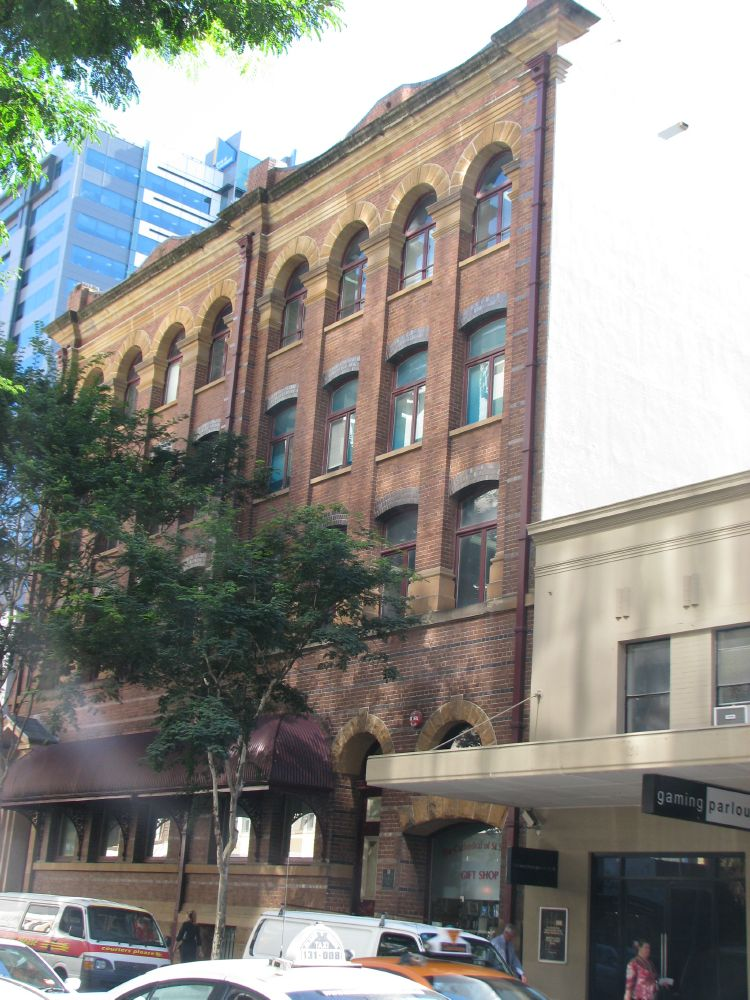
- Catholic Centre, 2008

- Location within Queensland Location within Australia
- 27.4694°S 153.0284°E
- Location: 149 Edward Street, Brisbane City, City of Brisbane, Queensland, Australia

History
- Design period: 1900–1914 (early 20th century)
- Built: 1900

Site notes
- Architect: Slatyer & Cosh

Queensland Heritage Register
- Official name: Catholic Centre, Edwards Dunlop Building
- Type: state heritage (built)
- Designated: 21 October 1992
- Reference no.: 600091
- Significant period: 1900 (fabric); 1901–1974 (historical)
- Significant components: tank stand, furniture/fittings, carriage/wagon/dray entrance

Catholic Centre is a heritage-listed converted warehouse at 149 Edward Street, Brisbane City, City of Brisbane, Queensland, Australia. It was designed by Slatyer & Cosh and built in 1900. It is also known as Edwards Dunlop Building. It was added to the Queensland Heritage Register on 21 October 1992.

== History ==
This building was erected in 1900 for Edwards Dunlop & Co Ltd, a Sydney-based paper merchandising firm. The architects were probably the Sydney firm Slatyer & Cosh. The building featured an electric lift, modern fire fighting equipment and an extensive telephone system.

The company occupied the building on 1 January 1901, the day of Federation. It was an apt moment, as Federation removed many of the obstacles to intercolonial trade, allowing Sydney-based companies like Edwards Dunlop to more economically tap the Queensland market.

By 1910 the company was considered to be the largest paper wholesaling firm in the state. It was the contractor to the Queensland Department of Public Instruction, supplying text and exercise books and wall maps to schools around the state. The company acquired adjoining portions of land in 1925 and 1957, taking their block in an L-shape to Charlotte Street.

In 1974 Edwards Dunlop moved to premises at Eagle Farm, and in the following year the building was purchased by the Roman Catholic Archdiocese of Brisbane. Renovations and modifications were undertaken which included the installation of a new lift and stairs, the construction of video and radio studios, and the provision of access to St Stephen's Cathedral. The building is currently occupied by various Catholic organisations.

In 2013, the Catholic archdiocese took the owners of the adjacent Exchange Hotel to court in an attempt to stop an extension to the hotel, citing the impact on both the Catholic Centre and St Stephen's Cathedral.

== Description ==
This polychrome brick and stone Federation era building comprises four storeys with a basement.

The upper three levels are encompassed by giant order pilasters that separate the window openings. These have plain capitals that support cut stone semi-circular arches over the top windows. The parapet has four shallow concave curves punctuated by projecting piers at the centre and ends.

The street facade has three entrances. The main entry on the western end is emphasised by a projecting stone pediment and another served as a carriageway. The windows to the major ground floor space are shaded by the later addition of a deep corrugated iron sun-hood supported on cast iron brackets.

The windows to the basement are separated by rusticated stone piers and protected by cast iron picket screens.

The rear of the building has been painted and has a tall T-shaped arched tank stand located centrally at the top.

Internally elements of finely detailed original joinery survive. Timber posts, beams and brick walls are unpainted.

== Heritage listing ==
Catholic Centre was listed on the Queensland Heritage Register on 21 October 1992 having satisfied the following criteria.

The place is important in demonstrating the evolution or pattern of Queensland's history.

The Catholic Centre is significant as a Federation era warehouse with a finely detailed face brick and stone facade, much intact internal structure, and joinery.

The Catholic Centre is significant for its contribution to the Edward Street streetscape, which here is dominated by late nineteenth and early twentieth century buildings.

The place is important in demonstrating the principal characteristics of a particular class of cultural places.

The Catholic Centre is significant as a Federation era warehouse with a finely detailed face brick and stone facade, much intact internal structure, and joinery.

The place is important because of its aesthetic significance.

The Catholic Centre is significant for its contribution to the Edward Street streetscape, which here is dominated by late nineteenth and early twentieth century buildings.
