= Monier =

Monier is a French name that may refer to the following notable people:

- Damien Monier (born 1982), French professional road bicycle racer
- Étienne Monier (1889–1913), French anarchist
- Evelyn Monier-Williams (1920–2015), English barrister
- Georges Monier (1892–1974), Belgian composer
- Iszlam Monier Suliman (born 1990), Hungarian Sudanese judoka
- Jean Monier (or Mosnier) (1600–1656), French painter
- Joseph Monier (1823–1906), French gardener, one of the principal inventors of reinforced concrete
  - Monier Ventilation Shaft 1 in Brisbane, Australia
  - Monier Ventilation Shaft 2 in Brisbane, Australia
  - Monier Ventilation Shaft 3 in Brisbane, Australia
- Louis Monier (born 1956), founder of Internet search engine AltaVista
- Monier Monier-Williams (1819–1899), British Indologist
- Pierre Monier (or Mosnier) (1641–1703), French painter
- Raúl Monier (born 1960), Argentine chess master
- Robert Monier (1885–1944), French sailor
- Sébastien Monier (born 1984), French-Mauritian footballer
- Thomas Monier, French slalom canoer
- Virginia Monier, American stage actress and theatre manager

== See also ==
- Monier Field, a baseball venue in Charleston, Illinois, USA
- Monier Group, a roofing company
- Monnier (disambiguation)
