= Monier Ventilation Shaft 1 =

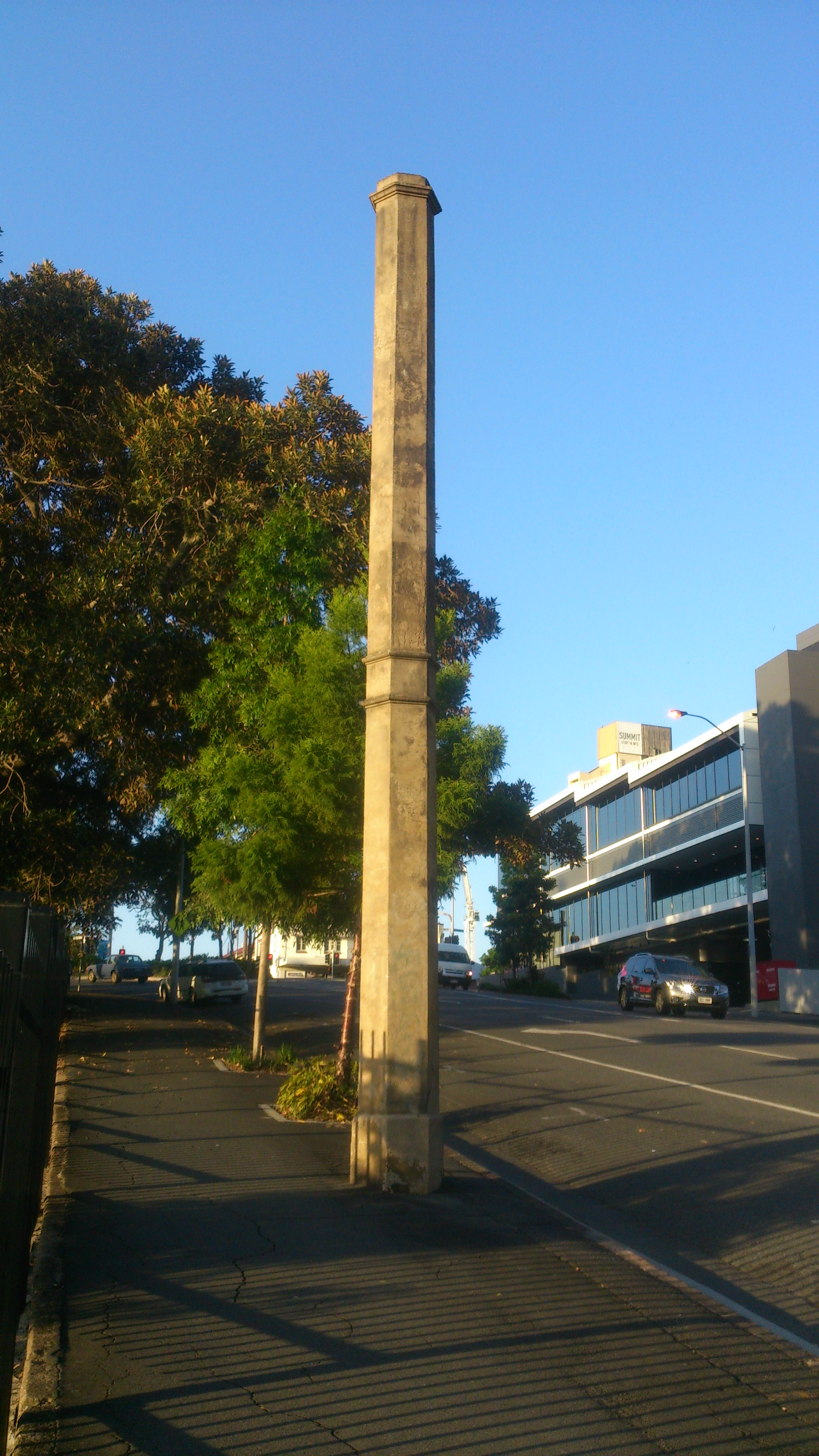

- Location within Queensland Location within Australia
- 27.4629°S 153.0209°E
- Location: 500 Wickham Terrace, Spring Hill, City of Brisbane, Queensland, Australia

History
- Design period: 1900–1914 (early 20th century)
- Built: c. 1904

Site notes
- Architect: Joseph Monier

Queensland Heritage Register
- Official name: Monier Ventilation Shaft 1 (Spring Hill)
- Type: state heritage (built)
- Designated: 4 August 1998
- Reference no.: 601995
- Significant period: c. 1904 (fabric); 1890s–1900s (historical)

Monier Ventilation Shaft 1 is a heritage-listed ventilation shaft at 500 Wickham Terrace, Spring Hill, City of Brisbane, Queensland, Australia. It was designed by Joseph Monier and built c. 1904. It was added to the Queensland Heritage Register on 4 August 1998.

== History ==
The Monier Ventilation Shafts are thought to have been constructed c. 1904, as part of a system of ventilation shafts (either concrete or steel/iron) located at intervals along some of Brisbane's inner city arterial stormwater drains. Three concrete shafts survive (of at least five erected) and may be the first pre-cast reinforced concrete structures in Queensland.

The Wickham Terrace shaft, on the footpath at the eastern end of Albert Park, opposite Twine Street, was one of a pair, the other having been erected just inside the park, opposite Lilley Street, but since removed. A concrete shaft of identical dimensions exists on the footpath of St Paul's Terrace, opposite Gloucester Street. Both the Wickham Terrace and St Paul's Terrace shafts appear to have been associated with the first Spring Hill stormwater drainage system, laid in the 1880s. A third shaft (Monier Ventilation Shaft 3), of similar but smaller dimensions, exists on the footpath near the former Queensland Primary Producers' Woolstore No. 8, in Florence Street, Teneriffe. Stormwater drains were laid in Florence and Ethel streets in mid-1904, and the concrete ventilation shaft at the east end of the Florence Street drain may have been constructed shortly afterwards.

In the 19th century, the distinction between drainage and sewerage was not well defined. Drains were described as sewers and they received a combination of sullage, roof and surface run-off. They relied on rainwater for flushing, and discharged to the nearest watercourse.

When Brisbane acquired municipal status in late 1859, there was no system of drainage or sewerage in the town. Most people dumped refuse in the creeks and channels, trusting that stormwater would carry it away to the river, and for some years the Municipal Council considered drainage and sewerage as one and the same thing. However, from about 1868 the Council adopted the policy of "rainfall to the river" and "sewerage to the land", developing a city drainage scheme to carry off stormwater and an earth closet sanitary service.

The Brisbane Drainage Act of 1875, under which the colonial government agreed to set aside crown land for sale to finance Brisbane's drainage scheme, provided the impetus for construction of Brisbane's early arterial stormwater drains. The systems were designed by the colonial government's Engineer for Harbours and Rivers, William David Nisbet, and carried out by government contractors under government supervision. Upon completion they became the property and responsibility of the Brisbane Municipal Council, which was responsible also for laying branch drains.

By 1878, the inner city was drained by three separate systems:

- the Frog's Hollow system – a main drain down Albert and Margaret Streets with branches laid by the Brisbane Municipal Council
- the Adelaide Street–Creek Street system, which drained the centre of the town from Makerston Street to Queen Street and the lower sections of Elizabeth and Charlotte Streets
- the Makerston Street system, which served the area between Makerston Street and Petrie Terrace, and between Wickham Terrace and College Road and the Brisbane River

Between 1879 and 1886 the Brisbane Municipal Council, with government loans, developed an arterial drainage system for the densely populated suburbs of Spring Hill and Fortitude Valley (even though Fortitude Valley then lay outside the Brisbane town boundary). Much of this work comprised open drains, which were covered in the late 1890s. South Brisbane and Kangaroo Point drainage systems were constructed in 1885–1886. In the late 1880s, the Brisbane Municipal Council drained parts of New Farm, and a drainage system for Petrie Terrace, begun in 1883, was completed in the late 1880s. By 1890, the Brisbane Municipal Council had completed an arterial drainage scheme for the city core, at a total cost of nearly £130,000.

The densely populated Booroodabin Division was annexed to the Municipality of Brisbane in 1903, and in 1908 a loan was secured to enable the council to complete the drainage of Merthyr, New Farm, Teneriffe, Bowen Hills, Mayne and Newstead by the end of 1909.

Without a proper sewerage system, Brisbane residents still tended to dispose of household and trade waste into the stormwater drainage systems. This led to the chronic pollution of local creeks, and foul smells emanating from the stormwater drains. Prior to bacterial theory being widely accepted, such miasma was thought to cause disease.

The situation was compounded in 1900 with the arrival of bubonic plague in Australia, carried by rats aboard ships arriving from foreign ports. The first case of human plague in Sydney was reported in January 1900, and in Brisbane (a day and a half away by steamer) on 27 April 1900. Between 1900 and 1909, plague broke out in most of Queensland's ports, galvanising the State into developing tighter controls over public health and sanitation.

In the early 20th century, the Commissioner of Public Health, using the strong coercive powers given to him under the provisions of the Health Act of 1900, required the Brisbane Municipal Council to erect ventilators in city streets to remove foul and unhealthy smells from the drainage systems. In 1900, the Council called tenders for the construction and erection of a ventilating shaft at Thorn Street, Kangaroo Point. No trace remains of this vent, except for its design, which was in the Monier system of re-inforced concrete, and identical with that of the vents that have survived on Wickham Terrace and St Paul's Terrace.

The Monier system of reinforced concrete (invented by Frenchman Joseph Monier and patented in 1867) was introduced to Australia in the early 1890s by WJ Baltzer, a New South Wales engineer. Monier's was the first true reinforced concrete, based on calculations which ensured that the steel was dispersed so as to take tension and shear forces. Baltzer, in association with contracting engineers Carter Gummow and Co. of Sydney, gained the Australian rights to this innovative fabric. The company constructed the first Monier system structure (a small arch for a storm water culvert) in Burwood, New South Wales, in 1894 and a sewer aqueduct linking the Sydney suburbs of Annandale and Balmain in 1895. The first use of the Monier system in Victoria was in 1897 with the Anderson Street Bridge over the Yarra River, designed and constructed by Carter Gummow & Co.

Carter Gummow and Co. began manufacture of Monier pipes in Sydney in 1897, and John Monash's Reinforced Concrete & Monier Pipe Construction Co. commenced production in Melbourne in 1903.

During the financial year 1903–1904, the Brisbane Municipal Council authorised the spending of £1,537 on erecting sewer (drain) ventilating shafts wherever they were urgently needed. It is thought that the surviving concrete ventilation shafts were constructed in consequence.

== Description ==
The three surviving concrete ventilation shafts are located in Brisbane's inner city suburbs of Spring Hill and Teneriffe. Two are in Spring Hill – one at the eastern end of Albert Park, on the footpath on Wickham Terrace opposite Twine Street; another on the footpath on St Paul's Terrace, opposite Gloucester Street. A third is located on the footpath in Florence Street, Teneriffe, west of the intersection with Macquarie Street. They ventilate stormwater drains rather than sewers.

The Spring Hill ventilators are located on ridges, but the Teneriffe ventilator is on low ground near the Brisbane River. It is not known what rationale was adopted in deciding where the vents were to be placed.

The ventilators are constructed of reinforced concrete, hexagonal in shape, with simple ornamentation at half height and apex. The Spring Hill ventilators are 30 feet (9.1 m) tall with a base width of 21 inches (530 mm). They have a wall thickness of 4.5 inches (110 mm) at the base, tapering to 3 inches (76 mm) at the top. The Teneriffe ventilator is of slightly smaller dimensions.

All three ventilators are thought to have been constructed in accordance with the patented Monier ventilation system for venting public sewers and drains, and probably pre-cast in an hexagonal mould, with the top face open.

== Heritage listing ==
Monier Ventilation Shaft 1 (Spring Hill) was listed on the Queensland Heritage Register on 4 August 1998 having satisfied the following criteria.

The place is important in demonstrating the evolution or pattern of Queensland's history.

The Monier Ventilation Shafts, constructed c. 1904, are important in illustrating late 19th/early 20th century attitudes toward public health and sanitation, and survive as visible evidence of Brisbane's early and extensive stormwater drainage scheme and venting system. The three surviving concrete shafts are thought to be the first pre-cast reinforced concrete structures in Queensland, and examples of the earliest application of the Monier system of reinforced concrete construction in Queensland.

The place demonstrates rare, uncommon or endangered aspects of Queensland's cultural heritage.

They provide rare surviving evidence of this early use of true reinforced concrete, and are significant as indicators of the technically advanced state of municipal engineering and construction in Brisbane at the turn of the 20th century.

The place has potential to yield information that will contribute to an understanding of Queensland's history.

They have the potential to contribute further to our understanding of:

- community attitudes toward public health in the late 19th/early 20th centuries
- Brisbane's early stormwater drainage scheme
- early pre-cast reinforced concrete technology in Queensland.

The place is important in demonstrating the principal characteristics of a particular class of cultural places.

The shafts are well-preserved examples of their type and show the engineering methods used in their design and construction.

The place is important because of its aesthetic significance.

They remain highly intact examples of their type and demonstrate engineering skill and involvement in creating aesthetically pleasing but functional structures.

The place is important in demonstrating a high degree of creative or technical achievement at a particular period.

They provide rare surviving evidence of this early use of true reinforced concrete, and are significant as indicators of the technically advanced state of municipal engineering and construction in Brisbane at the turn of the 20th century.

== See also ==
- Monier Ventilation Shaft 2
- Monier Ventilation Shaft 3
