= Acme Engineering Works =

Heritage-listed building in Brisbane, Queensland

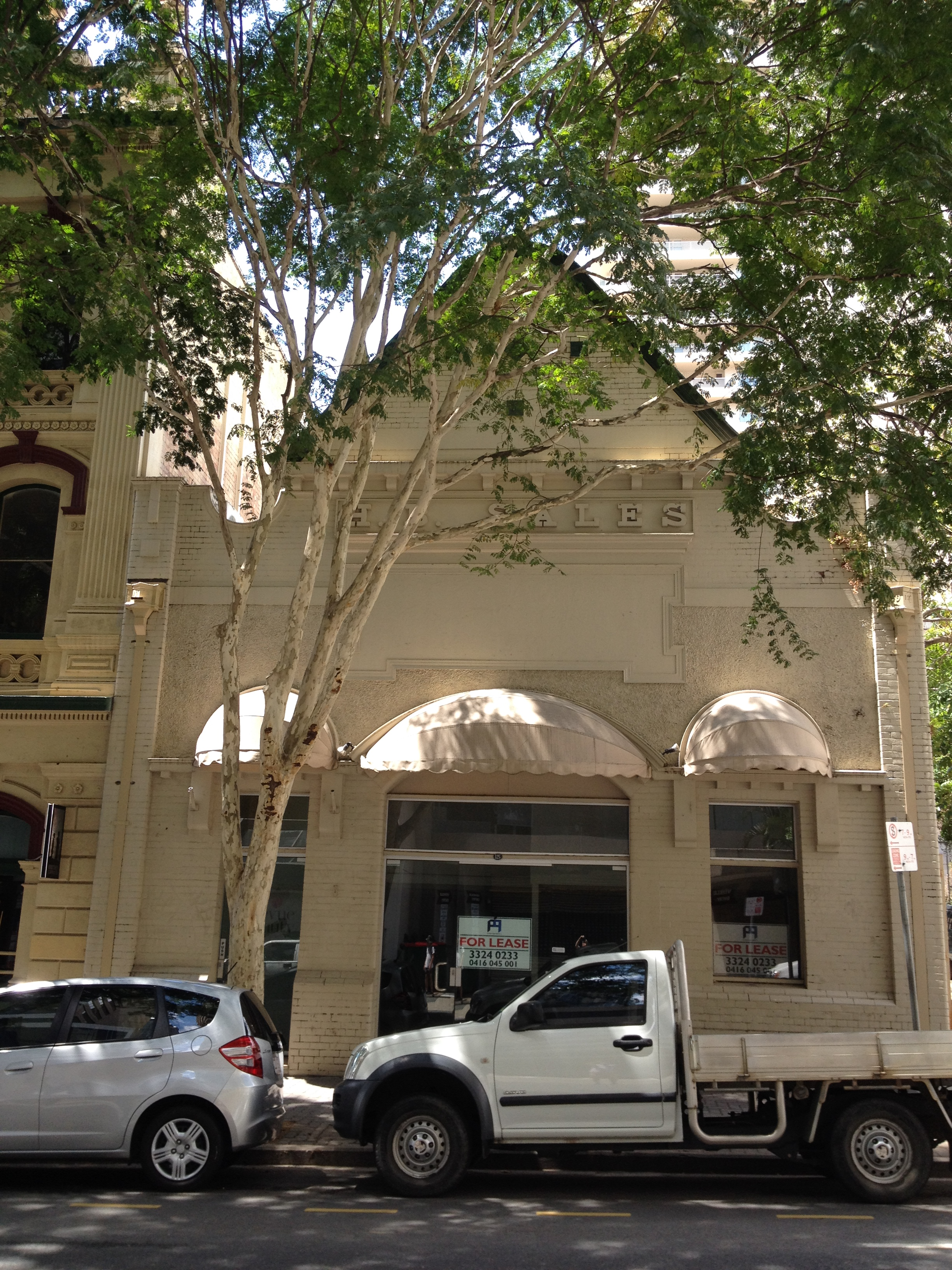
- H.B. Sales Building, 2014

- Location within Queensland Location within Australia
- 27.4734°S 153.0278°E
- Location: 125 Margaret Street, Brisbane City, City of Brisbane, Queensland, Australia

History
- Design period: 1900–1914 (early 20th century)
- Built: 1912

Site notes
- Architect: Frank Longland

Queensland Heritage Register
- Official name: HB Sales Building
- Type: state heritage (built)
- Designated: 23 April 1999
- Reference no.: 600125
- Significant period: 1912 (fabric); 1912–1928 (historical)
- Significant components: toilet block/earth closet/water closet
- Builders: George Edward Day

Acme Engineering Works is a heritage-listed workshop at 125 Margaret Street, Brisbane, Queensland, Australia. It is also known as the HB Sales Building. It was designed by Frank Longland and built in 1912 by George Edward Day. It was added to the Queensland Heritage Register on 23 April 1999.

== History ==
This single-storeyed brick building was erected in the second half of 1912 for Smith and Balls' Acme Engineering Works, on land acquired by Sarah Balls, widow, in the same year.

It was built during the period of expansion, rather than diversification, which characterised the rapidly growing Queensland economy from 1903 to 1914, and illustrates the continued early 20th century development of Frog's Hollow - the ground between George and Edward Streets, bounded on the west by Elizabeth Street and on the east by Alice Street - as a commercial and light-industrial precinct.

Low-lying and swampy, Frog's Hollow had been farmed by convict labour during the penal settlement of the 1820s and 1830s, and in the 1840s and 1850s was sparsely settled with cottages erected on the higher ground. In the busy post-Separation decades of the 1860s and 1870s, an ad hoc process of land filling was undertaken as Frog's Hollow became more densely populated by the working classes, and shophouses, house-workshops, small factories or workshops, boarding houses and hotels were erected. During the boom years of the 1880s, these residences and small workshops were replaced gradually with large and imposing commercial and industrial premises, as Frog's Hollow, conveniently located near the wharves along Eagle Street and Petrie Bight, emerged as Brisbane's principal light-industrial and warehousing precinct. Factories and workshops specialising in clothing, footwear, saddlery, furniture, building, printing, brewing, milling, confectionery or biscuit manufacture, coachmaking, ship- fitting and metal-working, as well as substantial importer and manufacturer warehousing, either were established or expanded. By the late 1880s, engineering and ironfounding firms were particularly prominent in the Edward-Alice-Margaret Street precinct, and included Smellie & Co.; Smith, Forrester & Co.; Harvey Sargeant & Co.; and Overend & Co. Development of Frog's Hollow slowed during the Depression years of the 1890s, but resumed in the first two decades of the 20th century.

Smith and Balls' 1912 engineering works contributed to this early 20th century consolidation of Frog's Hollow as a light-industrial precinct. Built next to Watson Brothers Building (1887), a Margaret Street plumbers, gasfitters and galvanised iron and lead works, the Acme Engineering Works was appropriately and conveniently located in the metal-working precinct concentrated around Alice, Margaret and lower Edward Streets.

Brisbane architect Frank Longland called tenders in June 1912 for the erection of brick premises in Margaret Street for the Acme Engineering Works. The successful tenderer was George Edward Day of New Farm. Longland, formerly an articled pupil of former colonial architect FDG Stanley, built up a small but successful architectural practice in Brisbane spanning the years 1893 to 1924. He was a Councillor of the Queensland Institute of Architects 1894–95, and was made a Fellow by 1913. Some of Longland's 1890s works have been identified - principally small commissions - and the Acme Engineering Works building in Margaret Street is one of his few known 20th century works to survive. He appears to have been a progressive architect who followed the latest in contemporary European architectural trends, his work ranging from the freestyle facade of the Acme Engineering Works (1912) to the restrained functionality of the 1918 Howes Brothers produce store at the corner of Petrie Terrace and Sexton Street. Of functionalist appearance in contrast to similar buildings of the period, the latter seems remarkably modern in outlook.

By 1913, Smith and Balls' Acme Engineering Works, consulting and marine engineers, coppersmiths, brass and iron moulders, blacksmiths and general engineers, had occupied their Margaret Street building. Acme Engineering Works, managed by Alex J Smith, had operated previously from 37 Charlotte Street, and specialised in milk condenser work. Smith appears to have gone into partnership with Mrs Sarah Balls, of the Stock Exchange Hotel in Queen Street, to facilitate the move to Margaret Street. The firm ceased business c. 1928, and in October that year title to the property was transferred to Charles Joshua Jeays, Arthur Vivian Jeays and Albert Frederick Jeays. Charles Joshua Jeays, builders' and plumbers' supplies, had occupied the site by 1930, and remained there until c. 1943. After the Second World War, the building is understood to have been occupied by Gardiner Batteries, whose principal business was located in O'Reilly's Buildings, Margaret Street, just south of the former Acme Engineering Works. In 1958 HB Sales, a chemical wholesale company, occupied the building. The property passed out of the Jeays family in 1963, and Orb Holdings Pty Ltd acquired title in 1978.

The building was being used as a specialist internet cafe, The Hub, at the time of its heritage listing in 1999. By 2012, it was leased by a cycling store; however, it was vacant and for lease in October 2013.

== Description ==
Adjoining Watson Brothers Building in Margaret Street, the Acme Engineering Works is a single-storeyed brick workshop with an early galvanised iron extension at the rear. The front freestyle facade is symmetrical around a wide central opening with flanking arched double-hung sash windows. All three openings in the front facade currently have individual canvas awnings. At each edge of the facade a pilaster extends up to the parapet. Situated on each pilaster is a downpipe whose rainwater head has the date 1912 cast onto it. Between the pilasters above the central opening is a plain rendered portion and above this the name HB SALES in raised lettering. The parapet has a raised centrepiece separated from the side pilasters by inverted semi-circular cut-outs. The centrepiece consists of a dentilled cornice supporting an unusual triangular pediment with a curved top, behind which a gable roof extends the length of the building. A water closet projects to one side at the rear of the brick building, behind which is the galvanised iron extension, extant by 1913.

Internally there is an early mezzanine level which has been extended toward the front of the building, with a new stair.

== Heritage listing ==
The Acme Engineering Works was listed on the Queensland Heritage Register on 23 April 1999 having satisfied the following criteria.

The place is important in demonstrating the evolution or pattern of Queensland's history.

The Acme Engineering Works erected in 1912 during Queensland's first 20th century boom, is important in demonstrating the evolution of Frog's Hollow as the principal warehousing and light-industrial sector of Brisbane's central business district, which was sustained from the second half of the 19th century through to the early decades of the 20th century.

The place demonstrates rare, uncommon or endangered aspects of Queensland's cultural heritage.

The Acme Engineering Works demonstrates several rare aspects of Brisbane's cultural heritage, being a rare extant example of a light-industrial workshop surviving in the Brisbane central business district and one of the few identified 20th century works by Brisbane architect Frank Longland. The freestyle facade was, and remains, a rare design for an industrial building in Brisbane.

The place is important in demonstrating the principal characteristics of a particular class of cultural places.

The building is important in demonstrating the principal characteristics of a small-scale brick Federation-era workshop, designed to impress, but with economy.

The place is important because of its aesthetic significance.

The Acme Engineering Works is significant for its streetscape contribution to Margaret Street. The decorative freestyle facade remains intact, and although the face-brickwork has been painted, retains its aesthetic appeal.
