= Monnieri =

The word monnieri (uncapitalized) is a specific epithet for animal and plant species meaning "of Monnier" or "of Le Monnier", and was used to commemorate one of several people having these surnames. Some species with the epithet are:

== In botany ==
- Bacopa monnieri - water hyssop
- Cnidium monnieri - Monnier's snowparsley
- Stachys monieri - alpine betony

== In zoology ==
- Enigmaticolus monnieri - a sea snail
