= Longlands (disambiguation) =

Longlands is an area of South East London within the London Boroughs of Bexley, Bromley and Greenwich.

Longlands or Longland may also refer to:

== Places ==
- Longlands, Bradford, a district in the city centre of Bradford, West Yorkshire
- Longlands Fell, a small fell in the northern part of the English Lake District
- Longland (Holicong, Pennsylvania), a historic home located near Holicong, in Buckingham Township, Bucks County, Pennsylvania
- Longlands School, former secondary school in Stourbridge, West Midlands, England
- Sir David Longland Correctional Centre, former name of Brisbane Correctional Centre, a prison facility in Wacol (near Brisbane), Queensland, Australia
- Longlands, County Down, a townland in the parish of Comber. County Down, Northern Ireland
- Longlands, County Antrim, a small area near Whitewell Road
- Longlands, Cumbria, is a place in Cumbria, England
- Longland River, a tributary of Hudson Bay, in Nunavik, Nord-du-Québec, Québec, Canada
- Longlands, New Zealand, a rural community near Hastings, New Zealand

== People ==
- Frank Longland (1870–1934), architect in Brisbane, Queensland
- Harry Longland (1881–1911), English cricketer
- Jack Longland (1905–1993), English educator, mountain climber, and broadcaster
- John Longland (died 1547), English bishop of Lincoln from 1521 to 1547
- Bob Longland, former Queensland Electoral Commissioner, sent as part of delegation to monitor the Solomon Islands general election, 2006

== Other uses ==
- Long Land Pattern, a version of the Brown Bess, a British Army's Land Pattern Musket in service 1722–1838
