= Monnier =

Monnier is a French surname. Notable people with the surname include:

- Adrienne Monnier (1892–1955), French poet, bookseller and publisher
- André Monnier (1926–2023), French ski jumper
- Blanche Monnier (1849–1913), French woman who was secretly kept locked up in a small room for 25 years
- Francis Monnier (fl. 1863), French literary figure
- Gabriel Monnier (born 1977), French figure skater
- Henry Monnier (1799–1877), French playwright, caricaturist and actor
- Jean-Charles Monnier (or Monier, 1758–1816), French Army general
- Louis Monnier (1900–1969), French track and field athlete
- Marc Monnier (1827–1885), French writer
- Mathilde Monnier (born 1959), French choreographer
- Paul Monnier (1907–1982), Swiss painter

== See also ==
- Le Monnier (disambiguation)
- Monier (disambiguation)
