= Watson Brothers Building =

Heritage-listed building in Brisbane, Queensland

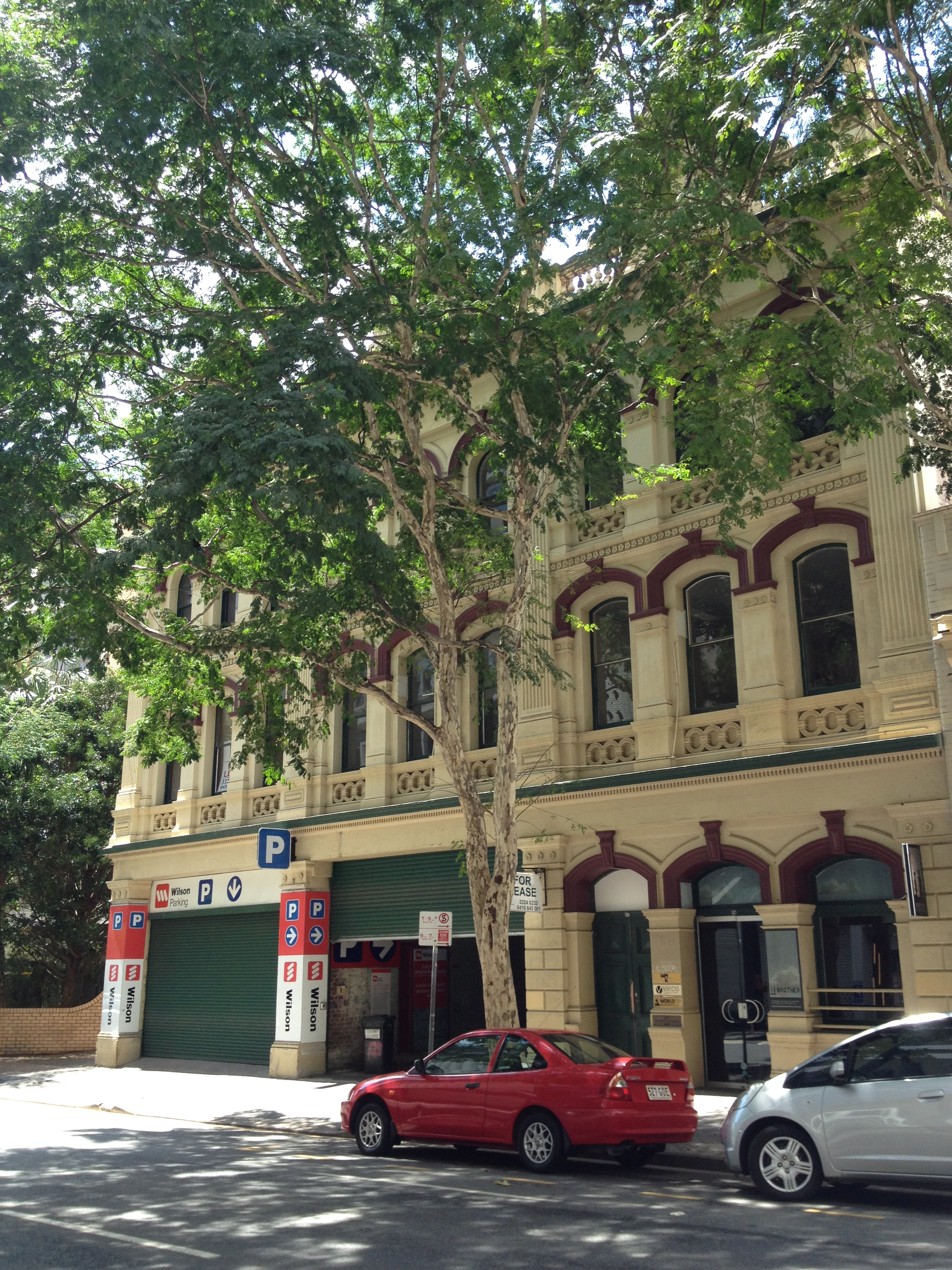
- Watson Brothers Building, 2013

- Location within Queensland Location within Australia
- 27.4733°S 153.028°E
- Location: 129 Margaret Street, Brisbane City, City of Brisbane, Queensland, Australia

History
- Design period: 1870s–1890s (late 19th century)
- Built: 1887–1918

Site notes
- Architect: Richard Gailey

Queensland Heritage Register
- Official name: Watson Brothers Building
- Type: state heritage (built)
- Designated: 23 April 1999
- Reference no.: 600126
- Significant period: 1887, c. 1918 (fabric); 1887–1961 (historical)
- Significant components: laneway, crane / gantry, workshop, warehouse, courtyard

Watson Brothers Building is a heritage-listed warehouse at 129 Margaret Street, Brisbane City, City of Brisbane, Queensland, Australia. It was designed by Richard Gailey and built from 1887 to 1918. It was added to the Queensland Heritage Register on 23 April 1999.

== History ==
This three-storeyed brick warehouse was constructed in 1887 for the successful Brisbane plumbing firm of Watson Brothers. It was designed by prominent Brisbane architect Richard Gailey, who in the 1880s and 1890s made a substantial contribution to Brisbane's central business district with his designs for commercial and industrial buildings such as shops, offices, hotels, warehouses and factories.

Watson Brothers Plumbing and Gasfitting Company was established by George Watson, senior, a Glasgow plumber who migrated to Brisbane in 1862, and by the mid-1860s had established a small plumbing business in Albert Street. In 1880 George retired leaving his four sons: George Watson, junior, Thomas, James and John Douglas, to continue the business. By the mid-1880s the firm, now known as Watson Brothers, was well established as plumbers, gasfitters and galvanised iron and lead works, with workshops in Edward Street and stores and an office in Eagle Street. George Watson Jnr was soon to take a prominent role in Brisbane's civic affairs: he was an alderman on the Brisbane Municipal Council from 1891 to 1896, and Mayor of Brisbane 1892–93.

Queensland's economic "high" of the 1880s produced an unprecedented building boom, especially in Brisbane. Watson Brothers plumbing and sanitary supplies business flourished, and in late 1885 the brothers purchased land in Margaret Street to accommodate a larger warehouse and workshop. Importantly, the site remained central and was close to the wharves along Eagle Street and Petrie Bight.

Watson Brothers' 1887 building was erected during a period of great change in the low-lying, swampy district of inner Brisbane known as Frog's Hollow – the ground between George and Edward Streets, bounded on the west by Elizabeth Street and on the east by Alice Street. The area was farmed by convict labour during the penal settlement of the 1820s and 1830s, and in the 1840s and 1850s was sparsely settled with cottages erected on the higher land. In the busy post-Separation decades of the 1860s and 1870s, an ad hoc process of land filling was undertaken as Frog's Hollow became more densely populated by the working classes, and shophouses, house-workshops, small factories or workshops, boarding houses and hotels were erected. During the boom years of the 1880s, these residences and small workshops were replaced gradually with large and imposing commercial and industrial premises, as Frog's Hollow, conveniently located near the wharves, emerged as Brisbane's principal light-industrial and warehousing precinct. Factories and workshops specialising in clothing, footwear, saddlery, furniture, building, printing, brewing, milling, confectionery or biscuit manufacture, coachmaking, ship-fitting and metal-working, as well as substantial importer and manufacturer warehousing, either were established or expanded. By the late 1880s, engineering and ironfounding firms were particularly prominent in the lower Edward, Alice and Margaret Streets precinct, and included Smellie & Co., Smith, Forrester & Co., Harvey Sargeant & Co., and Overend & Co. Watson Brothers incorporated a small workshop at the rear of their 1887 warehouse, which was appropriately located in the metal-working precinct of Frog's Hollow.

The Watson Brothers Building (1887), with its three storeys and ornate facade, was one of the more imposing of the Frog's Hollow warehouses. The upper level of a two level workshop at the rear of the property was accessed by a laneway at the side of the building. Similar warehouses/factories erected at this period included the 1887 speculative warehouse at the corner of Edward and Mary Streets (later Coal Board Building); Smellie & Co.'s 1888–89 warehouse at the corner of Edward and Alice Streets (now Old Mineral House); and George Myers & Co.'s warehouse (1889–90) in Edward Street (now the Metro Arts Theatre). All four were designed by architect Richard Gailey.

Gailey conducted a highly successful and prolific architectural practice in Brisbane for nearly 60 years, from 1865 until his death in 1924. While hotels were his speciality - he designed or modified over 30 in Brisbane alone in the period 1869–95 - he also designed a large number of substantial, often highly decorative, warehouses and office buildings, and contributed significantly to the re-building of Brisbane in the 1880s as a prosperous, late Victorian city.

Some of Gailey's other boom-era central city work survives, including the Tara House for the Irish Club (1877–1879) in Elizabeth Street; Colonial Mutual Life Building (1882–83) in Queen Street; Treasury Chambers (1885–86) in George and Elizabeth Streets (Elizabeth Street now a facade); and Finney Isles & Co.'s (1887) store at the corner of Edward and Adelaide Streets. Some of his CBD buildings have survived as facades only: Telegraph Newspaper Company offices (1878) in Queen Street (now part of the Myer Centre facade); the former Allan and Stark Building (1881–82 & 1885) on the opposite side of Queen Street; and Hill's Buildings (1888–89) in Queen Street, Petrie Bight (later the Queensland Country Life Building).

Gailey was architect to the Bank of New South Wales, the Brisbane Grammar School (from 1882) and the Children's Hospital (from 1883). A staunch Baptist, he designed the Baptist City Tabernacle (1889–90) at the corner of Wickham Terrace and Upper Edward Street and numerous suburban (mostly non-conformist Protestant) churches. Some of his better-known Brisbane residential work includes the alterations and additions to Fernberg (1888–90) at Paddington (now Government House); and Moorlands (1892) at Toowong.

Gailey's work was not confined to Brisbane, and examples of his work survive throughout Queensland. He was a prolific designer, whose decorative detailing retains its popular appeal. He was also a successful businessman and property developer, took a keen interest in civic, church and benevolent affairs, served on numerous committees and boards, was a prominent freemason, and was a foundation vice-president of the Queensland Institute of Architects in 1889–90. Gailey was at the forefront of the re-development of Brisbane in the 1880s, and his significance cannot be underestimated.

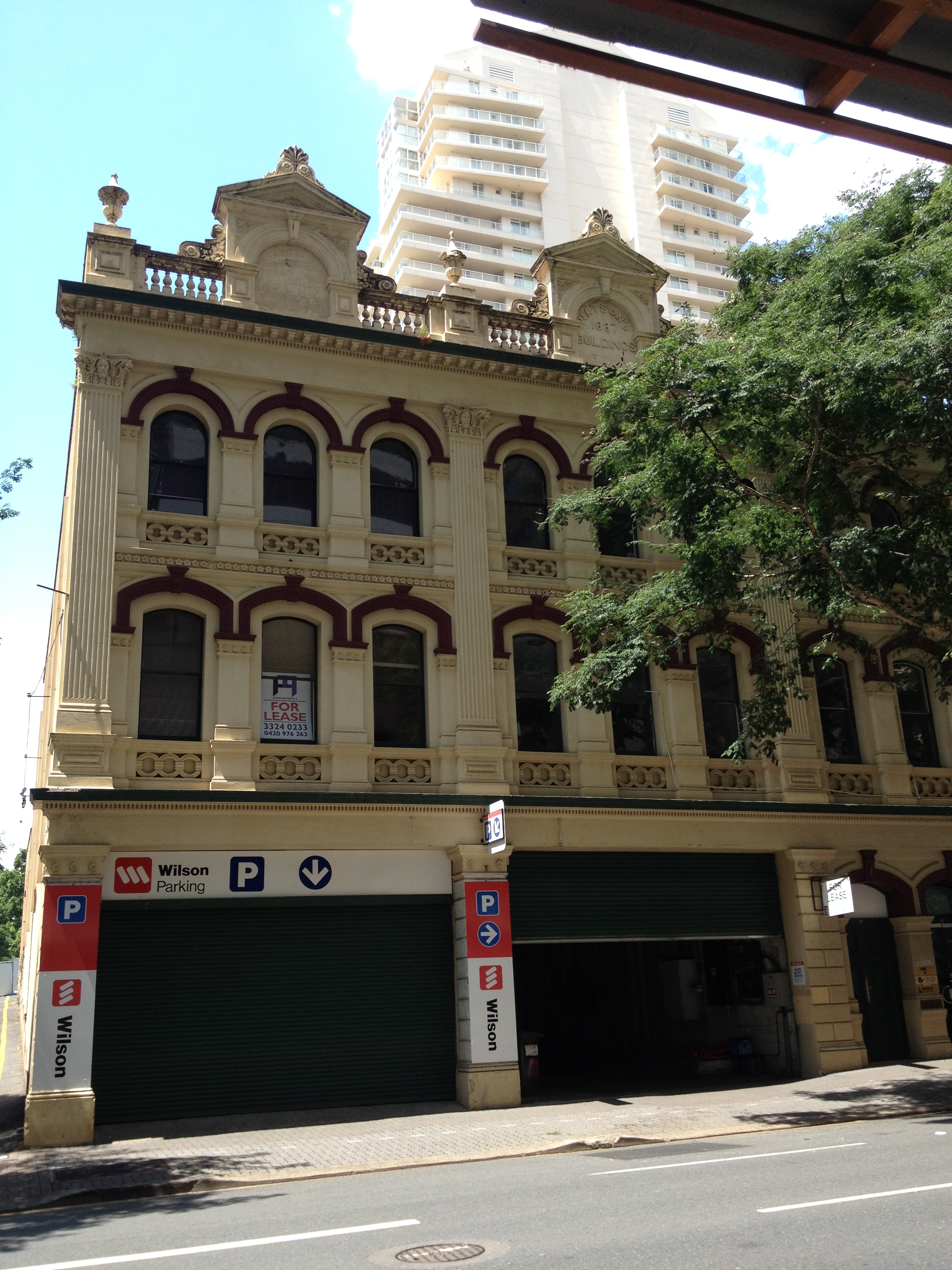
Ground floor: originally warehouse, carriageway, and offices

Watson Brothers' 1887 building was erected by contractors Smith and Balls (Henry Smith and John Irwin Balls), who had tendered with a price of £4500. When the provision and execution of the metal work by Watson Brothers was included, however, the actual cost of construction was over £6,000. When completed in October 1887, the building was described as a handsome three-storied pile, of brick with ornamental facade. [Queensland Figaro 22 October 1887:647] It had a frontage of 66 feet (20 m) to Margaret Street and a depth of 80 feet (24 m). The ground floor was divided into 3 sections:

- warehousing space on the north side
- a central carriage way which permitted wagons and carts to access the rear yard
- offices, with a storeroom behind, on the south side

The second floor was partitioned by three masonry walls with archway access between, and served as showrooms. The third storey contained a single, undivided space utilised as the packing and unpacking department. There were three rear doors on the second and third levels, and American lifts were installed to permit goods to be hoisted to or from the back yard. A shed and workshop, fitted with machinery and racks, was located at the rear of the yard - (this structure was two-storeyed by 1918, and probably by 1913) - and along the northern wall of the yard were out-offices and a three-stalled stables. In October 1887, a month before they opened, Watson Brothers advertised half to two-thirds of the building for lease. In subsequent years the firm occupied the entire warehouse.

Despite serious flooding in 1893 and an economic depression in the 1890s, by the turn of the century Watson Brothers had emerged as Queensland's largest plumbing and sanitary engineering business. In 1907 a retail plumbing supply and general hardware branch store was opened in Queen Street, and in 1918 a new plumbing workshop was erected on land adjoining the rear of the Margaret Street property, facing Alice Street. During the First World War, Watson Brothers carried out plumbing alterations to 90% of all vessels converted to troopships in Queensland and sent tradesmen to Sydney for the same task; during the Second World War the firm provided equipment for Australian and American forces in Brisbane. The business remained a family enterprise until 1961 when it was forced into liquidation. The Margaret Street property was sold in 1963 to Margaret Street Holdings and transferred to Orb Holdings in 1978. During the early 1980s the building was occupied by the Queensland Ballet Company.

In 2015, the former warehouse and central carriageway of the ground floor was used for car parking and the former ground floor offices was used as a cafe. The upper floors are divided into a number of small tenancies.

== Description ==
Watson Brothers Building is a three-storeyed brick warehouse with a rendered facade. It consists of three equal portions across. The ground floor section of the two northern portions have been removed for vehicular access, but dividing walls remain extending to the rear of the building. The surviving southern portion has three segmental arched openings. The left two openings are now recessed doorways and the other a window. Originally the most northern portion had a similar arrangement of openings while the central portion had a window to one side and large opening for carriage access to the rear. The pilasters to each side of the surviving southern ground floor portion are rendered to imitate stone coursework capped with mouldings and rosettes. Above this is a cornice with small dentils separating the upper two floors from the ground floor.

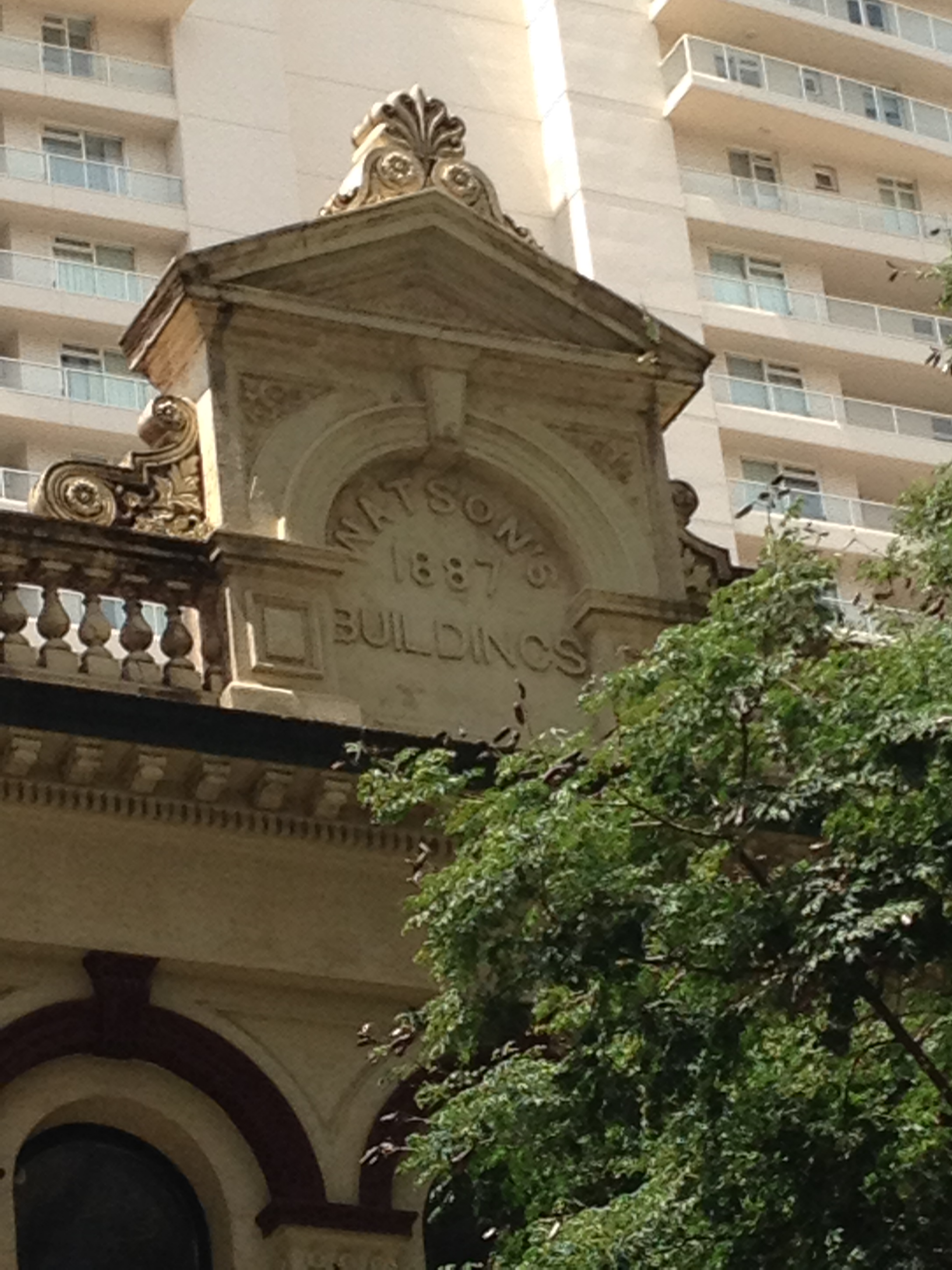
Central archway on the parapet

The three portions are divided on the two upper levels by fluted giant order pilasters with ornate Corinthian capitals that include grotesque masks. The first floor windows have segmental arches and the ones on the top floor are semi-circular. The arches are embellished with hood and label mouldings and decorated key stones. These openings have balustrading in their lower portion. A line of rosettes between pilasters separates the two upper floors. The words "WATSON BROS. LIMITED" appear painted on the frieze below the parapet. Centred on the parapet of each portion is a closed-off arch below a small triangular pediment and flanked by florid scrolls. An open balustrade links these and other solid sections of parapet which support urns, visually separating the three distinct parts of the building at parapet level. The central archway contains the words "WATSONS 1887 BUILDINGS". The side and back walls are unpainted brickwork. No trace remains of an earlier post-supported street awning (extant by c. 1902, but not part of the original design) with its curved corrugated iron roof and central archway.

On the side wall facing the laneway it is still possible to distinguish signwriting describing Watson's goods - hardware and plumbing supplies. The laneway provides a link across the city block and has a visual quality contributed to by the unrendered expanse of the side of the building. The rear elevation of the building is visually divided into three distinct portions relating to those of the front, each with a gable end. These have large central openings running through all levels and loading gantries located centrally above, although the central gantry has been removed. Smaller individual windows are situated to either side of each large opening on the upper two levels.

To the rear of the warehouse, and separated from it by an open courtyard, is a two storeyed building open to the north west. This timber-framed structure is supported on all sides but the north west, on stone walls bounding the property line and in sections acting as retaining walls. These stone walls, of squared porphyry rubble laid in courses, are extended in height by two generations of brickwork additions which support the triangular timber trusses of the corrugated iron skillion roof.

The walls and concrete floor of the courtyard bear evidence of earlier buildings on this site through a series of recesses left by the removal of earlier timber framing members, likely to be from early stables on the site.

Internally, large open areas of timber flooring still exist, but some internal partitioning has been added. From the new vehicular access ways the timber joists and herring-bone strutting of the floor above can be clearly seen. Some evidence of closed-off arched openings exist in the dividing walls at ground floor level.

== Heritage listing ==
Watson Brothers Building was listed on the Queensland Heritage Register on 23 April 1999 having satisfied the following criteria.

The place is important in demonstrating the evolution or pattern of Queensland's history.

Watson Brothers Building is important in illustrating the rise to prominence of local Queensland manufacturing and enterprise during the 1880s boom period, and demonstrates the evolution of Frog's Hollow as the principal warehousing and light-industrial sector of Brisbane's central business district during the second half of the 19th century.

The place demonstrates rare, uncommon or endangered aspects of Queensland's cultural heritage.

The site includes a late 19th century yard and remnant evidence of the original stables and out-offices, and a workshop extant by c. 1918, the survival of which in Brisbane's central business district is a now rare aspect of Queensland's cultural heritage.

The place is important in demonstrating the principal characteristics of a particular class of cultural places.

Watson Brothers Building is important in demonstrating the principal characteristics of an 1880s boom era warehouse with ornate detailing. It is one of a group of warehouses of similar scale and materials erected in Frog's Hollow during the late 1880s-early 1890s, which contribute to our understanding of late 19th century concerns with promoting commerce and industry through substantial and imposing building design.

The place is important because of its aesthetic significance.

Watson Brothers Building is significant for its streetscape contribution to Margaret Street in terms of the scale and rhythm of its facade, and the presence of a laneway exposing much of the northern side of the building. The highly decorative facade, intact above the ground floor, retains its aesthetic appeal.

The place has a special association with the life or work of a particular person, group or organisation of importance in Queensland's history.

The building is significant for its special association with local Brisbane plumbing firm Watson Brothers [earlier George Watson] and its contribution to Queensland's building industry for nearly a century. The building is also a fine example of the commercial work of influential Brisbane architect Richard Gailey, whose Brisbane [Queensland] practice spanned nearly 6 decades and who made a particularly significant contribution to the Brisbane townscape in the 1880s and 1890s.
