= Frank Longland =

Australian architect

Frank Longland (1870—1934) was an architect in Brisbane, Queensland, Australia.

== Early life ==
Frank Longland was born on 22 September 1870 in Brisbane, the son of David Ferdinand Longland and his wife Charlotte (née Sutton).

== Career ==
Frank Longland was an articled pupil of former Queensland Colonial Architect Francis Drummond Greville Stanley. Longland built up a small but successful architectural practice in Brisbane spanning the years 1893 to 1924. He was a Councillor of the Queensland Institute of Architects 1894–95, and was made a Fellow by 1913. Some of Longland's 1890s works have been identified – principally small commissions – and the Acme Engineering Works building in Margaret Street is one of his few known 20th century works to survive. He appears to have been a progressive architect who followed the latest in contemporary European architectural trends, his work ranging from the freestyle facade of the Acme Engineering Works (1912) to the restrained functionality of the 1918 Howes Brothers produce store at the corner of Petrie Terrace and Sexton Street. Of functionalist appearance in contrast to similar buildings of the period, the latter seems remarkably modern in outlook.

== Later life ==
Frank Longland died in Brisbane on 16 July 1934. His funeral on 17 July 1934 left his home Hayslope, Tennyson Road, Yeerongpilly for the Toowong Cemetery.

== Works ==
- Acme Engineering Works (also known as HB Sales Building), Margaret Street, Brisbane
