= Jean Monier =

French painter (1600–1656)

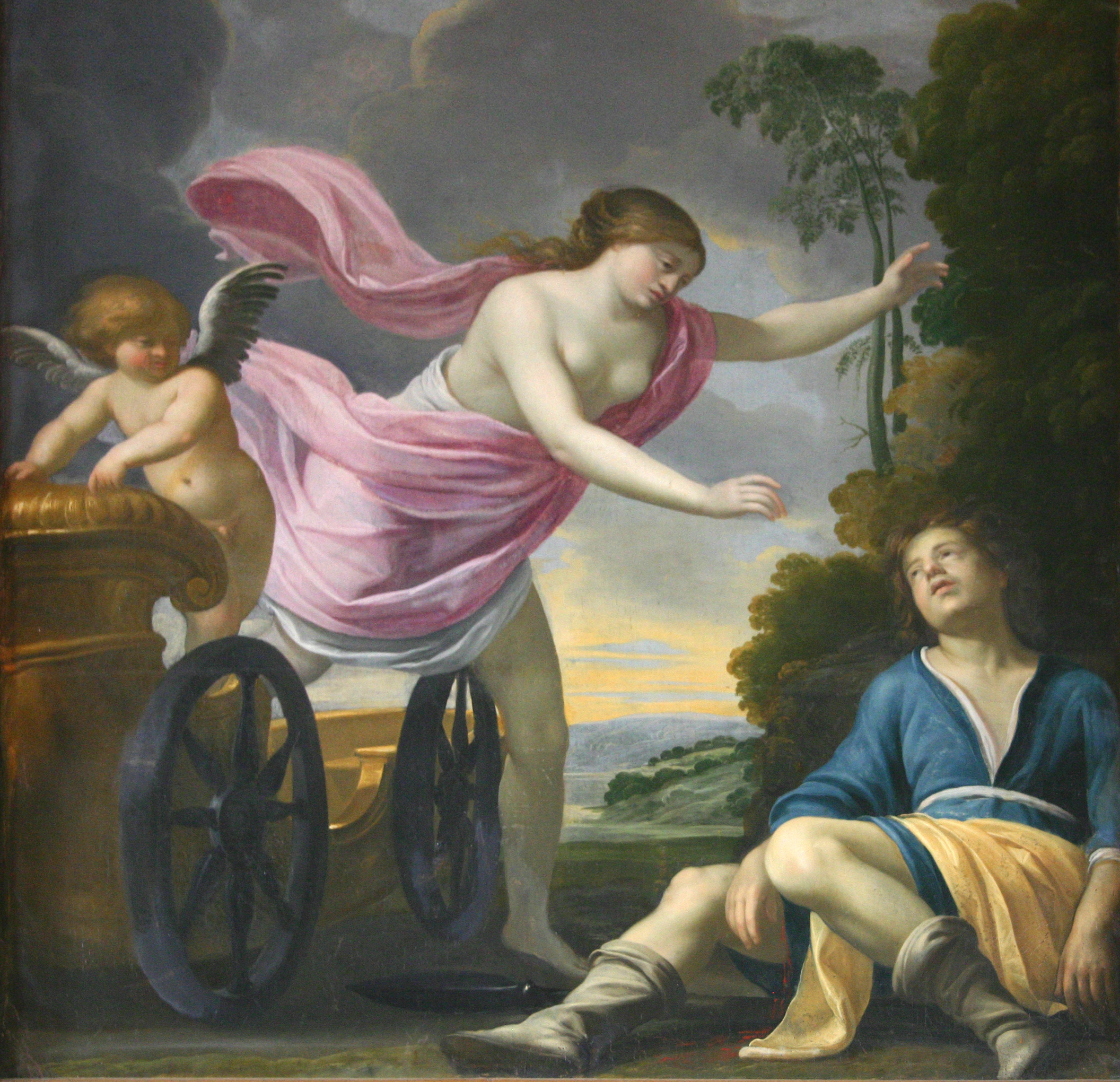
La mort d'Adonis, painted by Jean Monier, from château de Cheverny.

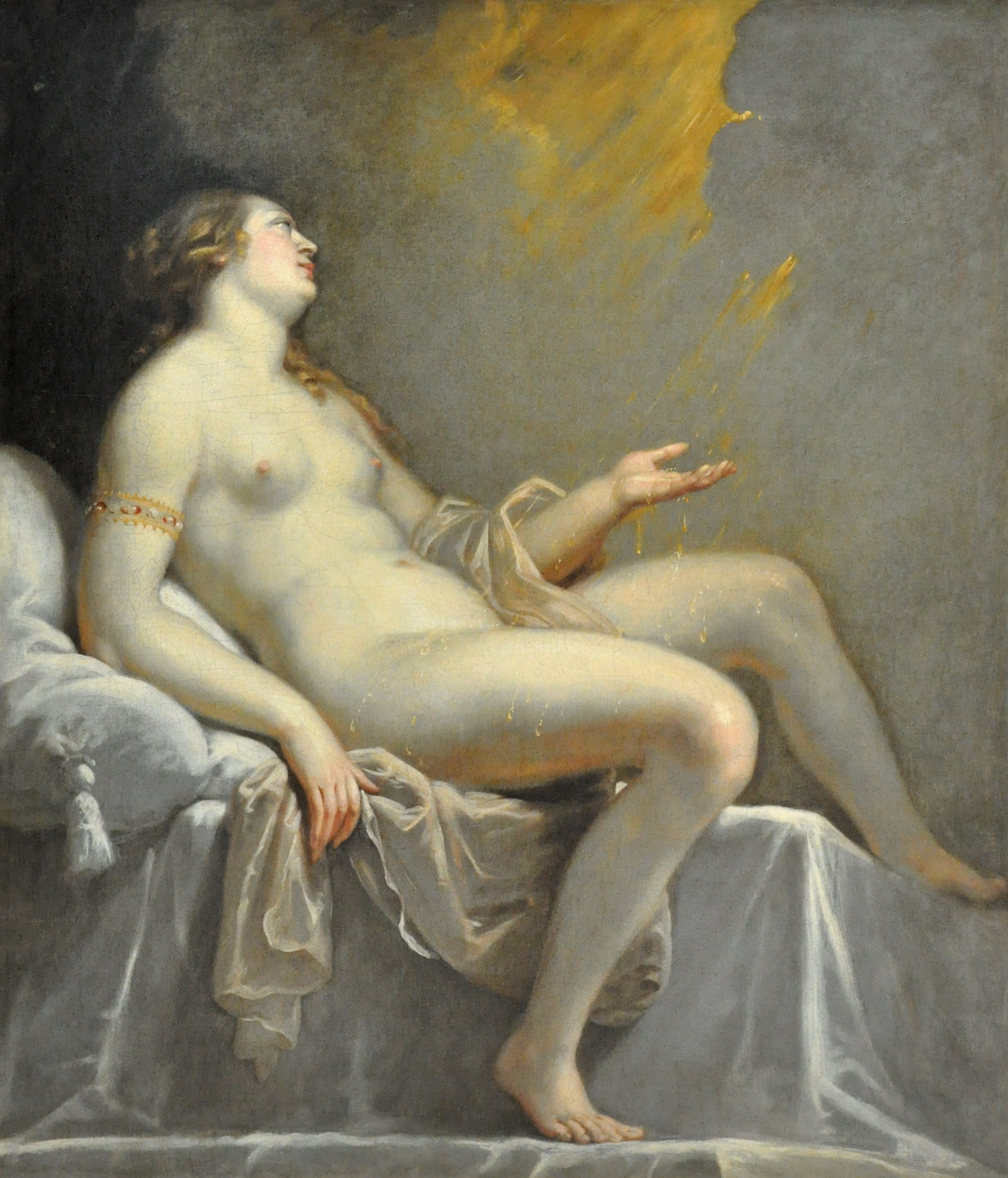
Danae

Jean Monier (or Mosnier; 1600–1656) was a French painter. He was born and died in Blois.

Monier's father also named Jean was a glass painter and early mentor. According to his earliest biographer, Jean Bernier, Monier executed for Queen Marie de Medici a copy the Virgin of the Green Cushion by Andrea Solari, which she gave to the Convent of the Cordeliers as a replacement for the original that she had accepted as a gift from the nuns. She was so impressed with his work that she rewarded him with a significant payment. He used the money to travel to Florence and Rome where he became familiar with the works of Nicolas Poussin. In 1623 Monier returned to France, and performed some additional work for Queen Marie. He then retired to briefly to Chartres, then eventually returned to Blois. Bernier also credits him with the discovery of a Holy Family by Raphael that had laid forgotten, gathering dust, in an attic of the Château de Blois. The painting rediscovered by Mosnier has been identified by Jan Sammer as The Holy Family of Francis I, Louvre inv. 604. This painting had been commissioned by Pope Leo X for Claude de France, who died at the Château de Blois in 1524. Jean Monier's son Pierre also became a painter. Monier died at Blois in 1656.

== Works ==
- La magnificence royale (Louvre)
