= Pierre Monier =

French painter (1641–1703)

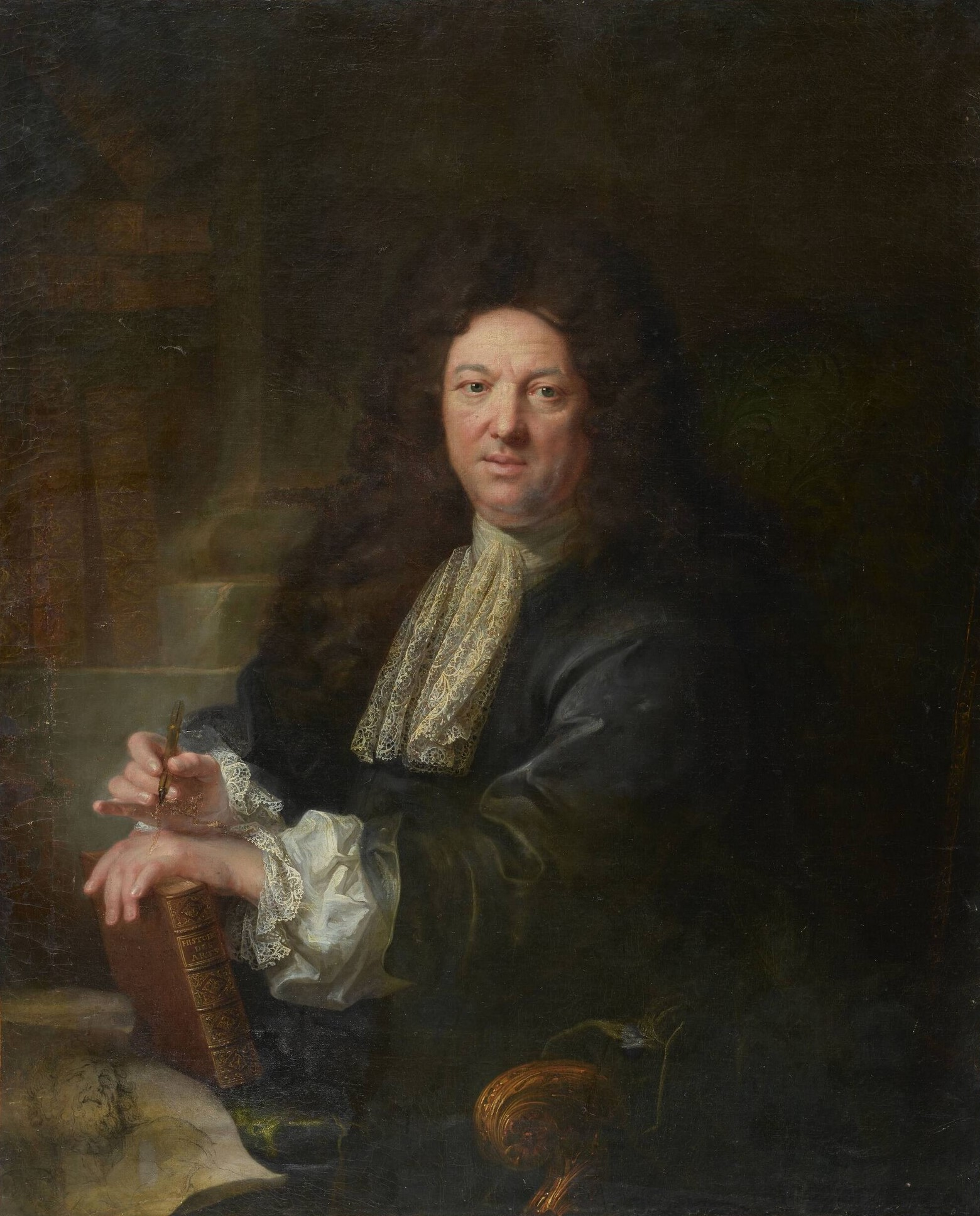
- Portrait by Robert Tournières, 1702
- Born: 17 May 1641; Blois, France
- Died: 29 December 1703 (aged 62); Paris, France
- Notable work: La Conquête de la Toison d’Or
- Parent: Jean Monier
- Awards: Prix de Rome (1664)

Pierre Monier or Mosnier (17 May 1641 – 29 December 1703) was a French painter and art historian.

Mosnier was born in Blois. His father Jean Monier was also painter, and was his first teacher. In 1664, he won the inaugural Prix de Rome for his painting la Conquête de la Toison d’Or ("The Conquest of the Golden Fleece"). In 1665, he travelled to Rome to continue his studies at the School of Rome. He moved back and took up residence in Paris, where he fulfilled a number of commissions, primarily religious-themed works for churches, such as for the Saint-Sulpice, Paris.

On 6 October 1674, he accepted as an Academician for his painting Hercule se préparant à la défense de la ville de Thèbes, sa patrie, menacée par les Minyens, et recevant d’Apollon des flèches, de Mercure une épée et de Vulcain une cuirasse.

Mosnier later taught at the Académie de peinture et de sculpture. In 1698, he wrote and published a series of three books on art: History of the Arts Associated with Drawing. Monier continued to paint until his death in 1703. He died in Paris.

== Selected works ==
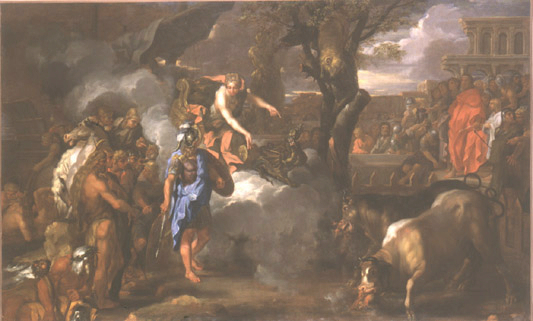
La Conquête de la Toison d'Or ("The Conquest of the Golden Fleece") (1664)

- 1664: La Conquête de la Toison d’Or
- 1665: le Parlement assemblé afin de juger un procès pour le marquis de Locmaviaker
- 1674: Hercule se préparant à la défense de la ville de Thèbes, sa patrie, menacée par les Minyens, et recevant d’Apollon des flèches, de Mercure une épée et de Vulcain une cuirasse
- 1698: Histoire des arts qui ont raport au dessein (Paris: Pierre Giffart) Digitization of first edition on Gallica
- 1699: Notre Seigneur Jésus-Christ, entouré de ses apôtres, appelle à lui les petits enfants

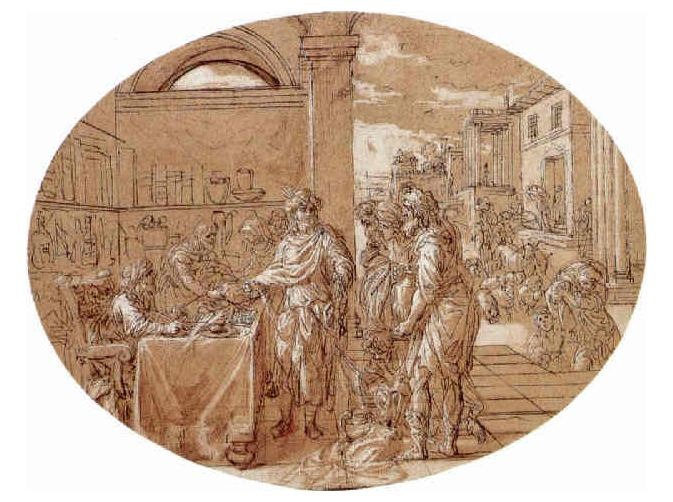
Dîmant au temple ("Tithing in the Temple") (year unknown)
