= Le Monnier =

Le Monnier or Lemonnier may refer to:

== People ==
- André Lemonnier (1896–1963), French admiral who pioneered French underwater research with Jacques Cousteau
- Anicet Charles Gabriel Lemonnier (1743–1824), French painter of historical subjects
- Camille Lemonnier (1844–1913), Belgian journalist and poet
- Charles Lemonnier (also known as Maurice Lemonnier, 1860–1930), Belgian liberal politician and mayor of Brussels
- Eduardo Le Monnier (1873–1931), French-Argentine architect who worked in the Buenos Aires Central Business District
- Élisa Lemonnier (1805–1865), French educationist who is considered to be the founder of vocational education for women in France
- Émile Lemonnier (1893–1945), French general
- Francis Lemonnier (1940–1998), French actor and director of the Parisian Théâtre des Variétés
- Hervé Lemonnier (born 1947), French rallycross, rally and ice racing driver of the Andros Trophy series
- Jérôme Lemonnier, French film composer, known from The Page Turner
- Louis-Guillaume Le Monnier (1717–1799), French natural scientist, brother of Pierre Charles
- Meg Lemonnier (1905–1988), British-born French singer and film actress
- Pierre Charles Le Monnier (1715–1799), French astronomer, brother of Louise Guillaume
- Pierre-René Lemonnier (1731–1796), French playwright
- Pierre Lemonnier (physicist) (1675–1757), French astronomer, father of Pierre Charles and Louis Guillaume
- Thomas-Paul-Henri Lemonnier (died 1927), 1906-1927 bishop of Bayeux-Lisieux

== Other ==
- Camp Lemonnier, United States Naval Expeditionary Base in Djibouti, named after Emile-René Lemonnier.
- Lemonnier premetro station, an underground tram station in Brussels, Belgium
- Le Monnier (crater), lunar crater named after Pierre Charles Le Monnier
- Le Monnier (publishing house), an Italian publishing house, founded in 1837 and bought in 1999 by Mondadori
