= Merthyr, Queensland =

Neighbourhood of New Farm, Brisbane, Queensland, Australia

Coordinates: 27°27′59″S 153°03′00″E

Merthyr is a former suburb of the City of Brisbane, Queensland, Australia. It is now a neighbourhood within the suburb of New Farm centred on Merthyr Road.

== History ==
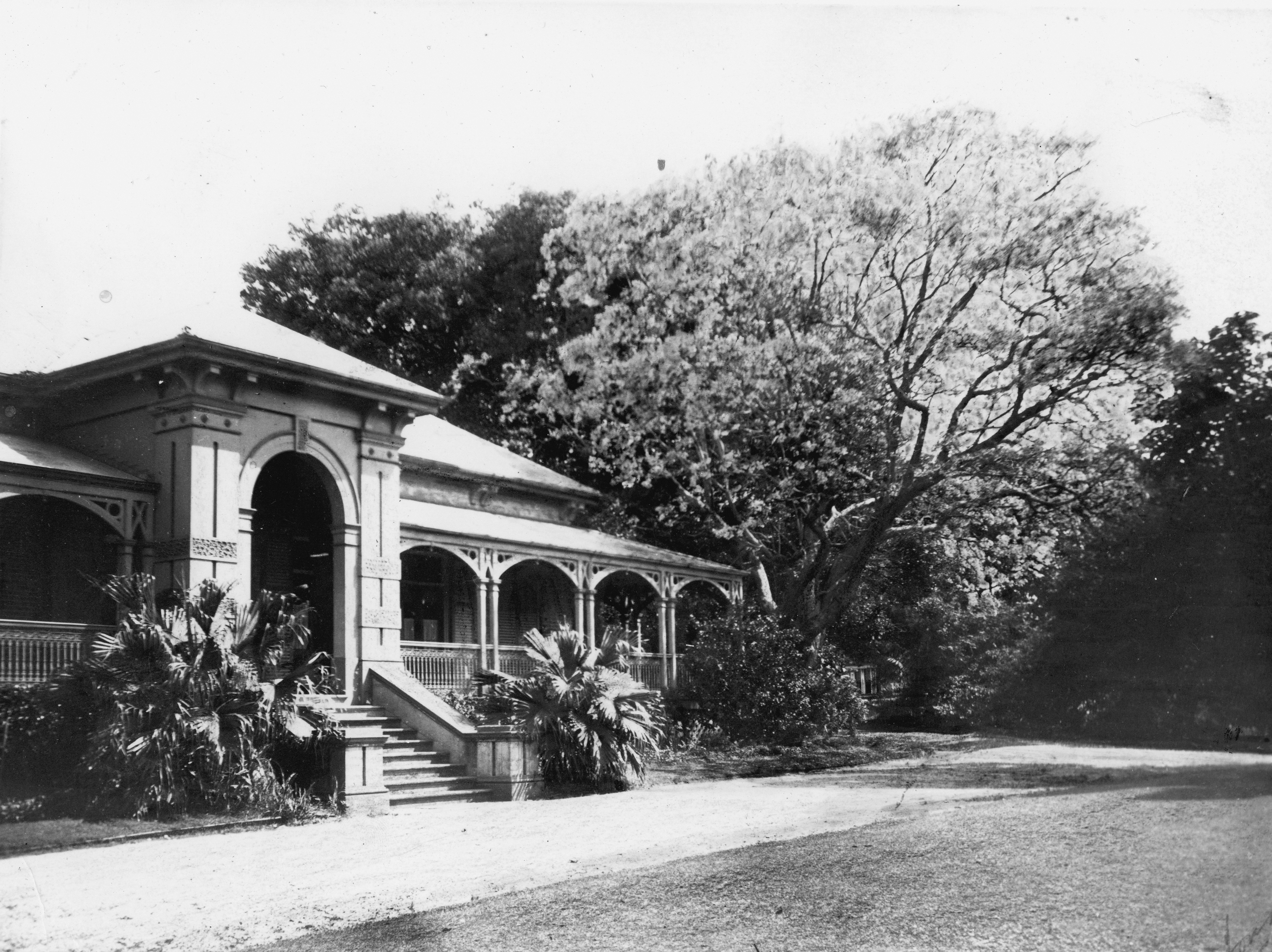
Exterior view of Merthyr House, c. 1928

The area takes its name from the residence Merthyr of Queensland Premier Samuel Griffith in Llewellyn Street overlooking the Brisbane River. He named the house after his birthplace, which was Merthyr Tydfil in Wales. Griffith died in 1920. The Merthyr property was subdivided in 1929. The house was demolished in 1963 as it was too expensive to maintain.

== Transport ==
It is the northside terminus of Tranlink Bus route 196, Fairfield Gardens to City to New Farm (Merthyr). It is also served by route 199, West End to City to New Farm (Teneriffe Ferry). The nearby stops are Stops 11 and 14 on Merthyr Road depending on direction of travel.

== Facilities ==
There is a small commercial precinct around the intersection of Merthyr Road and Brunswick Street, that includes Merthyr Village.
