= Teneriffe Village =

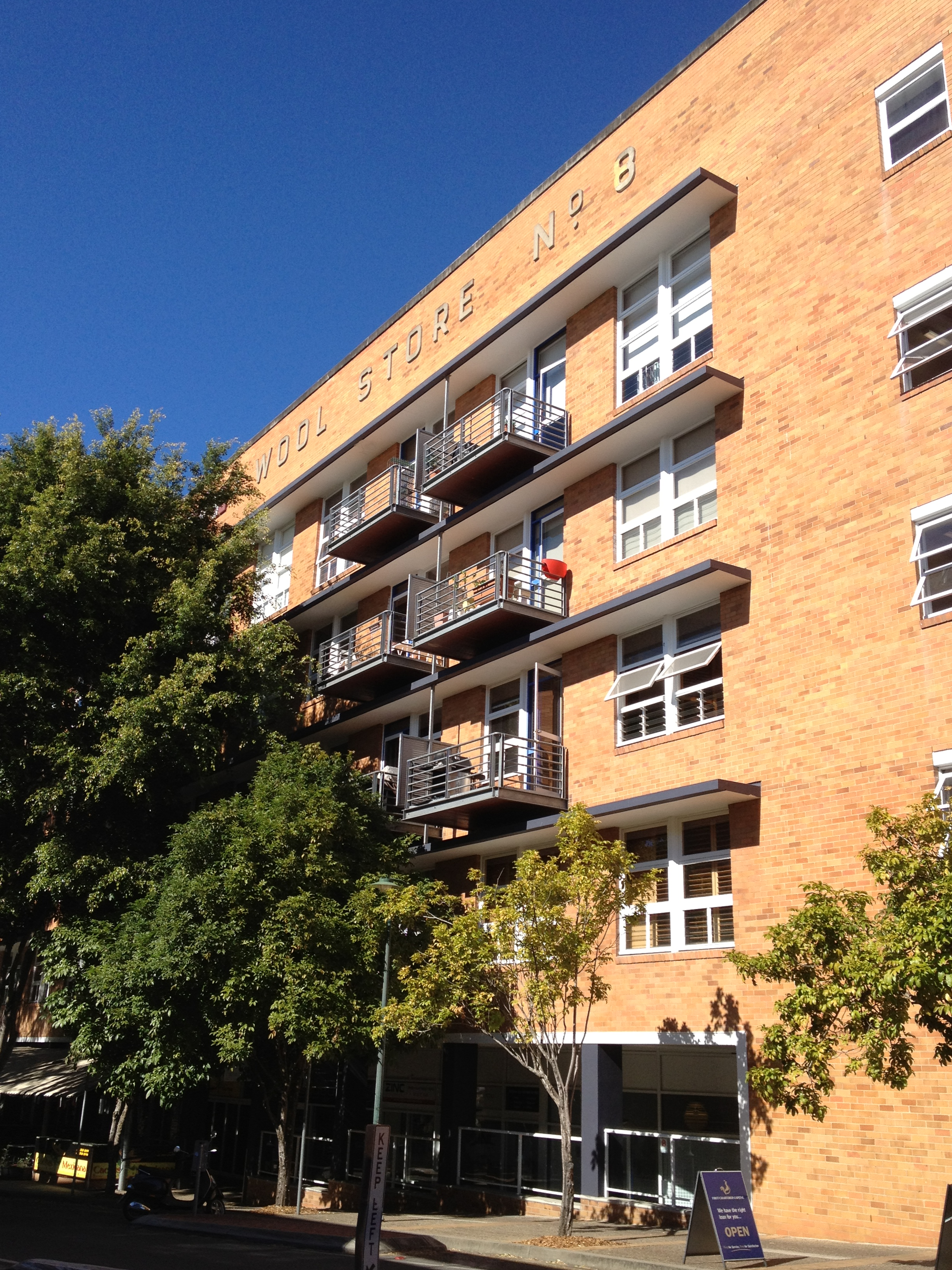
- Teneriffe Village (former woolstore), 2013

- Location within Queensland Location within Australia
- 27.4563°S 153.0494°E
- Location: 110 Macquarie Street, Teneriffe, City of Brisbane, Queensland, Australia

History
- Design period: 1940s–1960s (post-World War II)
- Built: 1955–1957

Queensland Heritage Register
- Official name: Teneriffe Village (former Paddys Market), Dalgety & Co. Ltd No 3 Woolstore, Queensland Primary Producers No 8 Woolstore
- Type: state heritage (built)
- Designated: 21 October 1992
- Reference no.: 600324
- Significant period: 1950s (fabric); 1957–1984 (historical use)

Teneriffe Village is a heritage-listed warehouse at 110 Macquarie Street, Teneriffe, City of Brisbane, Queensland, Australia. It was built from 1955 to 1957. It is also known as Dalgety & Co. Ltd No 3 Woolstore, Queensland Primary Producers, No 8 Woolstore, and Paddys Market. It was added to the Queensland Heritage Register on 21 October 1992.

== History ==
Paddy's Market was erected in 1955–57 as the new No 3 woolstore for the well-known pastoral firm of Dalgety & Co. Ltd. It was the second last store to be erected in the Teneriffe woolstore precinct, and the last in Dalgety's complex, which included a wharf and a wool dumping and grain store. As with earlier woolstores in the Teneriffe area, the building's function was to store and show Queensland wool, sales being conducted at the Wool Exchange in the Brisbane central business district. Like earlier woolstores, the top floor was occupied by a single large showroom, where buyers could examine the wool at leisure under suffusive natural lighting.

The site was owned from 1883 to 1906 by Queensland Brewery Ltd (later Carlton United), manufacturers of Brisbane's popular Bulimba Beer. By 1890 the company had established a brewery at the end of Florence Street, which at the time did not extend to Macquarie Street. In 1906 the woolstore site was sold to Dalgety & Co. Ltd, which built on this and adjacent land from 1906–07 onwards. Dalgetys were the first pastoral company to move into Teneriffe, which in the 1910s and 1920s developed as Brisbane's principal woolstore precinct, to which wool was railed and shipped from all over Queensland, awaiting auction by the large pastoral companies like Dalgety's which dominated the wool industry.

Three major factors shaped this development: the presence of a railway, the availability of deep river wharfage, and the expansion of primary industry in Queensland.

In 1897 the Colonial Sugar Refinery and its wharf were constructed south of Merthyr Road, along with the Bulimba branch railway line connecting the refinery to the main network. Convenient bulk transport was crucial for the movement of wool from distant properties to the woolstores, rail being the cheapest means of bringing the product in for storage until it was shipped out some time after sale. Until the construction of Dalgety's large wharf and first woolstore (1906–07) at Teneriffe, bales were stored in bondstores scattered around Brisbane. Following Dalgety's move into the area, five more stores were erected in Teneriffe during the wool boom between 1909 and 1915, and the excellent wool years and building boom between 1924 and 1925 were responsible for another five, at an outlay of some £3,000,000. During the early 1930s, when wool contributed 50 percent of Queensland's total exports, Brisbane averaged ten wool sales a year, and two more stores were built. Four were added during the 1940s, but these were not as substantial, and only one had a showroom. The wool boom of the 1950s occasioned the construction of the final two woolstores in Teneriffe: Dalgety's new No 3 Store, and Australian Estates No. 2 Store (1957) in Macquarie Street.

When Florence Street was extended through to Macquarie Street early in 1955, Dalgetys demolished their No 3 single-storey corrugated iron store and No 4 two-storey single brick woolstore. These were replaced in 1955–57 by the present brick building. Jack Michod, Dalgety's Queensland Wool manager, was very involved in the design, in particular regarding natural lighting, floor room spacing and an innovative chute control system. These technological and operational features reflected new marketing procedures in Queensland's wool industry during the boom of the 1950s.

From the mid-1960s, changing economic pressures, the advent of containerism, technological advances in core sampling of wool, and improved breeding standards, caused the wool industry to change to single-level storage, labour-saving methods and computer trading, few of which were feasible at Teneriffe. The pastoral company which was the first to move into the Teneriffe area was also the first to move out. In 1961 Dalgety & Co. Ltd merged with New Zealand Loan and Mercantile Agency Company, and as Dalgety & New Zealand Loan Ltd, in 1964 built a new wool centre at Rocklea, selling the redundant Teneriffe No 3 woolstore to Queensland Primary Producers.

From the mid-1960s, the importance of the Teneriffe facilities to the Queensland wool industry slowly declined, and the Teneriffe wharves, having failed to keep pace with technological changes, and lacking sufficient depth for container vessels, were supplanted in 1977–78 by the Port of Brisbane Authority's new river-mouth facilities at Fishermans Island.

Since the mid-1970s, many of the former woolstores at Teneriffe have been recycled for office, storage and retail purposes. In 1984 Primaries transferred their No 8 Woolstore to "Paddy" John Stephens, who established a market trading centre in the building. As Paddy's Market, the place has become a popular Brisbane shopping and tourist venue.

== Description ==
Paddy's Market is a five-storeyed, brick-clad, steel-framed building which has an irregular shape to suit the site.

A strong horizontal emphasis is achieved by means of rows of windows with concrete sunshades. The building has exposed concrete at the head of the windows with most projecting. Timber framed hopper windows are arranged in two and three panels wide. Some sections have two windows with a louvre section below. Sections of the top floor are four panes high. The ground floor is a mixture of windows and openings, many of which were loading bays originally, in a less regular pattern than the upper floors.

An exhaust duct of galvanised steel extends along the Macquarie Street facade up the length of the building and exhausts above the parapet. A similar duct is on the north side of the building. Also along part of the Macquarie Street facade, terracotta tiles extend from ground level up to the projecting concrete above the head.

The top of the large parapet is a rendered capping. On the west side parapet is the lettering Queensland Primary Producers Woolstores No.8.

The roof of the building has a sawtooth structure with south lights which are not at right angles to the facade of the building. This sawtooth roof, from which the top floor showroom is suffused with light, is usual in woolstore construction.

The internal structure is reinforced concrete floors and steel columns, with a series of trusses supporting the sawtooth roof. It is understood that the river frontage necessitated piers to 28 metres (92 ft) below ground level. Each floor is over 4000 square metres in area.

The ceiling is lined with hardboard and internal brickwork is painted. One lift is located on the south side and a goods lift on the north side. A series of fire escape stairs are throughout the building with one constructed on the footpath on the east side.

Like some Interwar woolstores, a rail siding was accommodated internally on the ground floor. Office accommodation was provided on the ground, first and third floors, access being gained by means of an elevator and concrete stairs.

As Paddy's Market, the ground floor and sections of the first to third floors of the building have been partitioned for a variety of stalls. The showroom floor is occupied by a large fabric cash and carry enterprise.

Of the original equipment, three wool elevators, three wool drops and five wool chutes have been removed, but the original passenger lift survives. Also removed were the internal rail lines, office accommodation and other items associated with the woolstore. A connecting walkway to the former Dalgety Wool Dumping & Grain Store is no longer extant.

== Heritage listing ==
Teneriffe Village (former Paddys Market) was listed on the Queensland Heritage Register on 21 October 1992 having satisfied the following criteria.

The place is important in demonstrating the evolution or pattern of Queensland's history.

Paddy's Market is important in demonstrating the pattern of Queensland's history, illustrating that the importance of the Teneriffe wool handling facilities to the Queensland wool industry was sustained well into the mid-20th century, as well as highlighting operational and marketing procedures employed in Queensland's wool industry during the boom of the 1950s. Paddy's Market remains an integral element of the most cohesive group of woolstores in Australia, illustrating the development of the Queensland wool industry from the early 1900s to the 1950s.

The place demonstrates rare, uncommon or endangered aspects of Queensland's cultural heritage.

This group remains as rare surviving evidence of an industry upon which much of the wealth of Queensland (and of Australia) was built. Paddy's Market also has rarity value as one of only two Teneriffe woolstores illustrating the final postwar stage of development in an industrial process and associated building form which are now superseded, including the orientation of the south-facing roof trusses in relation to the building.

The place is important in demonstrating the principal characteristics of a particular class of cultural places.

Paddy's market is important in demonstrating the principal characteristics of the broad class of brick, concrete and steel woolstores which were built in Australian ports, including Teneriffe, to serve the wool industry after the Second World War, but which illustrates a continuity of traditional elements and form in the materials and style of the 1950s.

The place is important because of its aesthetic significance.

The building is part of a group of woolstores which have formed a landmark along the Brisbane River for many years, and for over a decade has had a special social association for the Queensland community as Paddy's Market.

The place has a strong or special association with a particular community or cultural group for social, cultural or spiritual reasons.

The building is part of a group of woolstores which have formed a landmark along the Brisbane River for many years, and for over a decade has had a special social association for the Queensland community as Paddy's Market.
