= Joseph Monier =

French gardener & principal inventor of reinforced concrete (1823-1906)

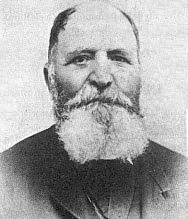
Joseph Monier

Joseph Monier (French: [mɔnje]; 8 November 1823 – 13 March 1906) was a French gardener and one of the principal inventors of reinforced concrete.

== Overview ==
As a gardener, Monier was not satisfied with the materials available for making flowerpots. Clay was easily broken and wood weathered badly and could be broken by the plant roots. Monier began making concrete pots and tubs, but these were not stable enough. In order to strengthen the concrete containers, he experimented with embedded iron mesh. He was not the first to experiment with reinforced concrete, but he saw some of the possibilities in the technique, and promoted it extensively.

Monier exhibited his invention at the Paris Exposition of 1867. He obtained his first patent on 16 July 1867, on iron-reinforced troughs for horticulture. He continued to find new uses for the material, and obtained more patents — iron-reinforced concrete pipes and basins (1868); iron-reinforced concrete panels for building façades (1869); bridges made of iron-reinforced concrete (1873); reinforced concrete beams (1878). In 1875, the first iron-reinforced concrete bridge ever built was constructed at the Castle of Chazelet. Monier was the designer.

The important point of Monier's idea was that it combined steel and concrete in such a way that the best qualities of each material were brought into play. Concrete is easily procured and shaped. It has considerable compressive or crushing strength, but is somewhat deficient in shearing strength, and distinctly weak in tensile or pulling strength. Steel, on the other hand, is easily procurable in simple forms such as long bars, and is extremely strong. But it is difficult and expensive to work up into customized forms. Concrete had been avoided for making beams, slabs and thin walls because its lack of tensile strength doomed it to fail in such circumstances. But if a concrete slab is reinforced with a network of small steel rods on its undersurface where the tensile stresses occur, its strength will be enormously increased.

François Hennébique saw Monier's reinforced concrete tubs and tanks at the Paris Exposition and began experimenting with ways to apply this new material to building construction. He set up his own firm the same year and in 1892 he patented a complete building system using the material.

In 1885 German engineer Gustav Adolf Wayss (1851–1917) bought Monier's patent and developed it further. He conducted further research in the use of reinforced concrete as a building material, and established a number of construction companies for reinforced concrete (the most famous are Wayss & Freytag and Beton- und Monierbau AG).

== Further details of career and projects ==
Saint-Quentin-la-Poterie is about 5 km north of Uzès and some 30 km north of Nîmes. Joseph was one of ten children born to a family of horticulturists in the service of the duc d'Uzès. All hands being needed in the fields, Joseph was not sent to school. By the age of 17 he had proved his worth as a gardener, and the duke offered him a post at his mansion in Paris. Joseph took the opportunity to attend evening classes and learned to read and write. When friends of the duke began to ask his advice, his horizons widened and he started to make the high-level contacts that were to define his later career. In 1846 he left the duke's service to take up a post at the Tuileries Gardens near the Louvre. Responsible for the orangery, he began to look for a more durable form of container for the orange trees, which were moved from the open air into the greenhouses during the winter. He began to make them of cement (mixed with sand, cinders, and/or crushed firebricks) and reinforced them with a grid of iron rods. There was a general notion at the time that thermal expansion and contraction of embedded iron would rupture the concrete. It seems that Monier spent some years experimenting with his containers in order to prove that this was not the case.

In an era when municipal water supply systems had not yet been established, Monier realised that his containers could be used for the collection and storage of water for gardens. He continued his education with courses in horticulture and landscape gardening. In 1849, without quitting his post at the Tuileries, he opened a small workshop, and began to take on landscaping projects. These took him as far afield as Strasburg. The fashion at the time was to decorate large gardens with rockeries and grottoes and to form these from plain concrete. For further economy, formed hollow artificial boulders from his ferro-cement (French: "ciment et fer"). He also created small garden pavilions, shaping and carving the concrete surface to imitate the rustic wooden originals. In July 1867 he exhibited his ideas at the second Paris International Exhibition (Exposition universelle). In the same month he applied for his first patent for containers, which was granted as No. 77165. Soon after he applied for an addition covering pipes, and yet another for ornamental pools. His projects included a 20 cubic metre reservoir and a terrace roof. By 1869 his establishment included offices, workshops, and greenhouses, plus stables for eight draught horses and three carriage horses. In September of that year he applied for a patent for panels suitable for cladding buildings, and for use as pavers and tiles.

In 1870 he suffered a major reversal. Napoleon III had declared war on Prussia with disastrous results. Paris was under siege for 4 months and in December, starving citizens invaded Monier's property and removed everything edible, including the horses. His caretaker died attempting to resist them. In January 1871, the Prussian bombardment ruined what was left. Monier and his family clung on through the severe winter. Though peace was declared in March, the citizens of Paris refused to concede. Monier and his workers started rebuilding the business under the rigours of the Commune.

As life returned to normal, the business flourished. Monier's reputation spread mainly by word of mouth. He built a large number of reservoir tanks in this period. Although many were small, a tank at Bougival (1872) with a domical roof had a volume of 130 cubic metres. Two tanks of 1000 cubic metres each were built at what is now Bruyères à Sèvres. The two-storey reservoir at Pessac has a 10 cubic metre tank perched above a 20 cubic metre tank, the supporting columns being in the form of tree trunks.

Monier was careful to check with clients after some years, to ensure that his products had performed well, and to obtain testimonials. His customers included Alphonse de Rothschild, Baron Max de Springer, and Monsieur Tapinart, marquis de Tillière. Most of his projects were concentrated to the west of Paris, where he lived, and especially around the village of Neuilly.

In 1873 Monier applied for an addition to patent 77165 to cover bridges, and in 1875 built his first bridge for the marquis de Tillière. It spans 14 metres across the moat of the chateau. The girders are integral with the slab, and the guard rails are in the rustic style, imitating wood, a decorative technique described today by the term: faux bois (French for "false wood").

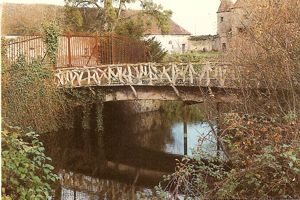
Bridge at Chazelet.

About 1875 Monier built a staircase leading to the offices above his workshop and applied for a patent to cover this form of construction. Another application in 1878 covered reinforced concrete railway sleepers. When granted, this became the basis for a series of further additions. It contained a clear statement that the cement protected the iron against rusting. An application in 1878 related to reinforced concrete T-beams.

As municipalities expanded their water supply and sewerage networks, there was a growing need for pipes, but a diminishing need for reservoir tanks. Monier was obliged to go further from urban areas in search of clients. In 1886, he was granted Patent 175513 for a system applicable to housing. The technique is recorded in photographs of a demonstration house which is shown under construction; completed; and in course of demolition. Monier described the house as proof against earthquakes, ice, humidity, heat, and fire and received a commission to build such a house in Nice, possibly as a result of a recent earthquake. Monier's second son Paul asked to work on this project. On 24 November 1887, Paul was killed when he fell from the scaffolding. As Monier's eldest son, Pierre, had severed his relationship with his father over a family argument, Joseph found himself with no sons of working age to help him in the business.

In June 1888, the firm of "J Monier constructeur" was declared bankrupt, and in April 1889 went into liquidation. However, in 1890 he formed a new firm: "L'Entreprise générale de travaux en ciment J Monier". In 1891 came yet another application for a patent: for conduits for telephone and electricity cables. About this time Monier built his last-known project, a service reservoir for an Old People's Home at Clamart, donated by Marie de Ferrari, duchesse de Galliera (global coordinates 48.79756, 2.261623). The reservoir structure is 10 metres high and 8 metres in diameter. The floor of the tank is 8 cm thick, and the roof 5 cm thick. The exterior decoration was designed by architect Prosper Bobin in a neo-classical style. The reservoir is still extant (2010).

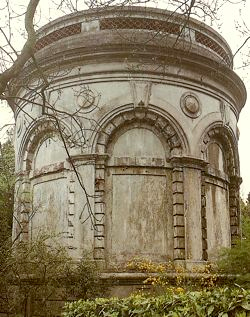
Reservoir at Clamart.

After this, it seems that Joseph was at least semi-retired, living with his three elderly sisters and his second wife.

Monier's son Pierre had moved to Noyon after the break with his father, established a family, and entered the same line of business, under the name "Monier fils". He probably returned to Paris in 1889, where he exhibited at the Exhibition of that year. The firm's projects included a reinforced concrete laundry building, and pipes for a sewage treatment plant. Unfortunately, Pierre died prematurely, apparently before 1900, without being reconciled with his father. By that year, a firm was trading as "Société des travaux en ciment de La Plaine-Saint-Denis, ancienne maison Monier fils" (i.e. formerly "Monier fils"). Projects completed by this firm include a partly in-ground reservoir at Vimoutier; an iconic elevated reservoir in the rustic style at Pontorson; the Cambodian Pavilion at the 1900 Exhibition; and two elevated reservoirs at Boullaye-Mivoie and Fonville, with their associated pump house.

In retirement, Monier was harassed by bailiffs and by the tax office, which reasoned that he should have been receiving large commissions from his many foreign patents. He sought refuge in the house of his son Lucien, by his second wife. In 1902 a number of foreign firms that had profited from his patents appealed to the President of France to grant him a pension, describing him as the inventor of reinforced concrete, and as their "former master" (ancien maître). They opened a subscription for his benefit, and contributions came from far afield. A petition was later organised asking that he be granted a post running a government tobacco kiosk. Monier expressed his gratitude for these efforts in a letter published in the journal "Le Ciment" in 1902. He died on 13 March 1906 and was buried in the municipal cemetery of Billancourt. The "Société des travaux en ciment" was still in operation in that year, when it exhibited at the Paris Exhibition.

== Monier patents outside France ==
Monier took out patents in many countries, throughout Europe and overseas. Some of these were registered in the name of the patent agent, in accordance with local law, the British patent of 1883 being in the name of John Imray. Typically, patents were valid for 15 years, but it was necessary to pay a significant yearly fee to maintain them. Monier opted to sell his rights outside France to local businessmen and engineers for a lump sum payment.

Monier's name was widely publicised through the work of Gustav Adolf Wayss (1851–1917). Wayss gained control of the Monier patents throughout Germany and Austria by a process of purchase and merger, and promoted the technique as "Das System Monier" or "Monierbau". Research into the science and mathematics of reinforced concrete structures progressed rapidly in the last decade of the 19th Century. The main contributors working under the banner of Monierbau, were Matthias Koenen and Emil Mörsch. Work was initially concentrated on arch bridges, and only later extended to buildings.

=== The Monier name in Australia ===
Starting from the 1890s, patents were taken out on behalf of Wayss in Australia. Initially, the main products were pipes and arch structures using the Monier system as refined by Wayss and his colleagues. The White's Creek and Johnston's Creek Aqueducts are the first reinforced arch structures, in Australia. They were built by firms associated with Frank Moorhouse Gummow, and design engineer William (Wilhelm) Julius Baltzer in 1897/8.

Monier pipes produced by Gummow Forrest & Co, joined end-to-end, were used as tubular foundations for a number of bridges built by the Public Works Department of NSW, the first being over Cockle Creek near Newcastle. Joseph's name was perpetuated in the Monier Pipe Company of Melbourne, and its successor, the Monier Pipe & Reinforced Concrete Construction Company. The engineer for these companies was (Sir) John Monash. About 20 Monier arch bridges were built in Victoria.
