= Frog's Hollow =

Historic locality in Brisbane, Australia

Coordinates: 27.4727°S 153.0282°E

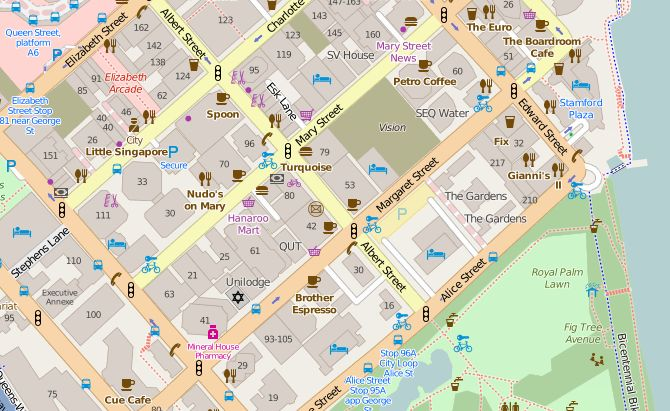
OpenStreetMap - Frog's Hollow

Frog's Hollow was a historic neighbourhood in Brisbane, Queensland, Australia. It was a colloquial name used for the low-lying land surrounding the intersection of Albert Street and Margaret Street in the central business district. In recent years, the name has seen something of a revival in common usage.

== Geography ==
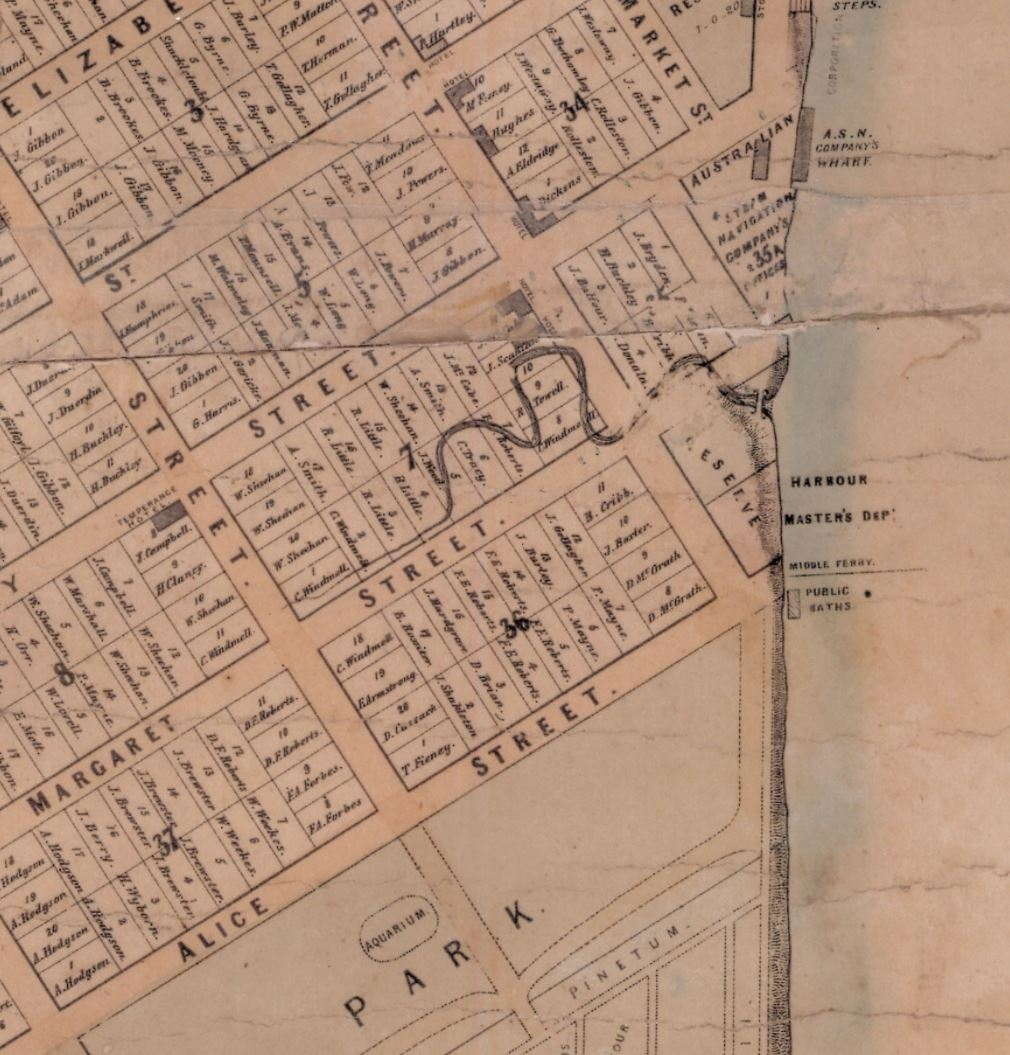
Map showing creek flowing through Frog's Hollow, 1863

Although not formally bounded, the neighbourhood was generally regarded as being from George Street (which is a ridge) down to Edward Street and between Elizabeth Street and Alice Street.

A creek used to pass through this swampy area joining the Brisbane River in the vicinity of the intersection of Alice Street and Edward Street. Although little more than a plank of wood, Brisbane's first British made bridge was over this creek, allowing the convicts to cross to their farm.

== History ==
Being low-lying and swampy, with mosquitoes and periodic flooding, the area was not the most desirable part of colonial Brisbane. Being cheaper, the area attracted warehouse developments, as well as housing and businesses catering to the lower class. It was both the red light district and Chinatown of colonial Brisbane. Prostitution, sly grog, and opium dens could all be found in Frog's Hollow, giving the area a bad reputation.

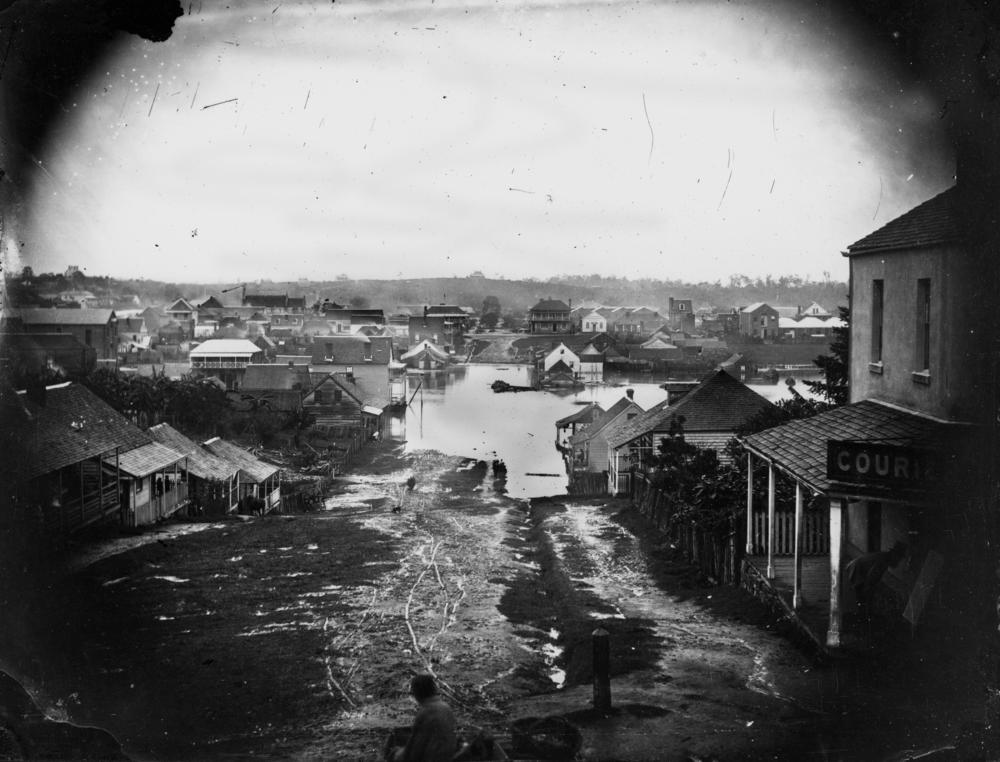
Charlotte Street in Frog's Hollow during the 1864 flood

During the 1880s, numerous Anti-Chinese Leagues were formed which organised many demonstrations to persuade the government to cease immigration from China. On Saturday 5 May 1888, one such demonstration in Brisbane, fuelled by alcohol, turned into a riot, where the mob of an estimated 2,000 people attacked Chinese homes and businesses. The riot spread to Chinese premises in other parts of Brisbane, including South Brisbane and Fortitude Valley. The police did little to quell the riot, with Police Inspector Lewis saying afterwards that "the majority of the people in the street were respectable citizens and would probably have been injured had this been done!". The only person arrested was subsequently acquitted.

== Present day ==
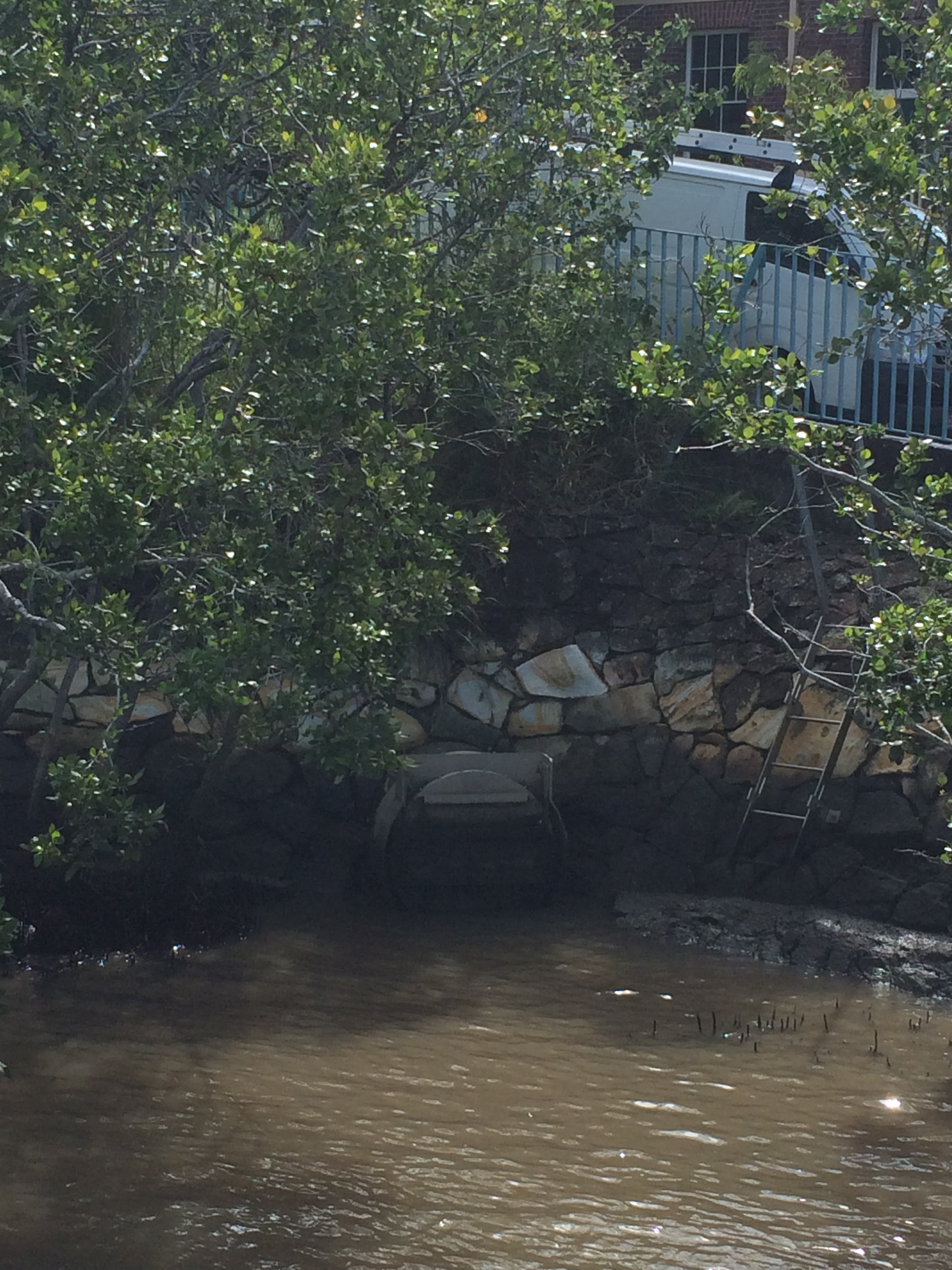
Creek outlet into the Brisbane River, 2015

The creek is no longer visible but the approximate location of the bridge is marked by a modern sculpture at the former Port Office. The convict farm is now the City Botanic Gardens.
