= Margaret Street, Brisbane =

Street in Brisbane, Queensland

Margaret Street Queensland
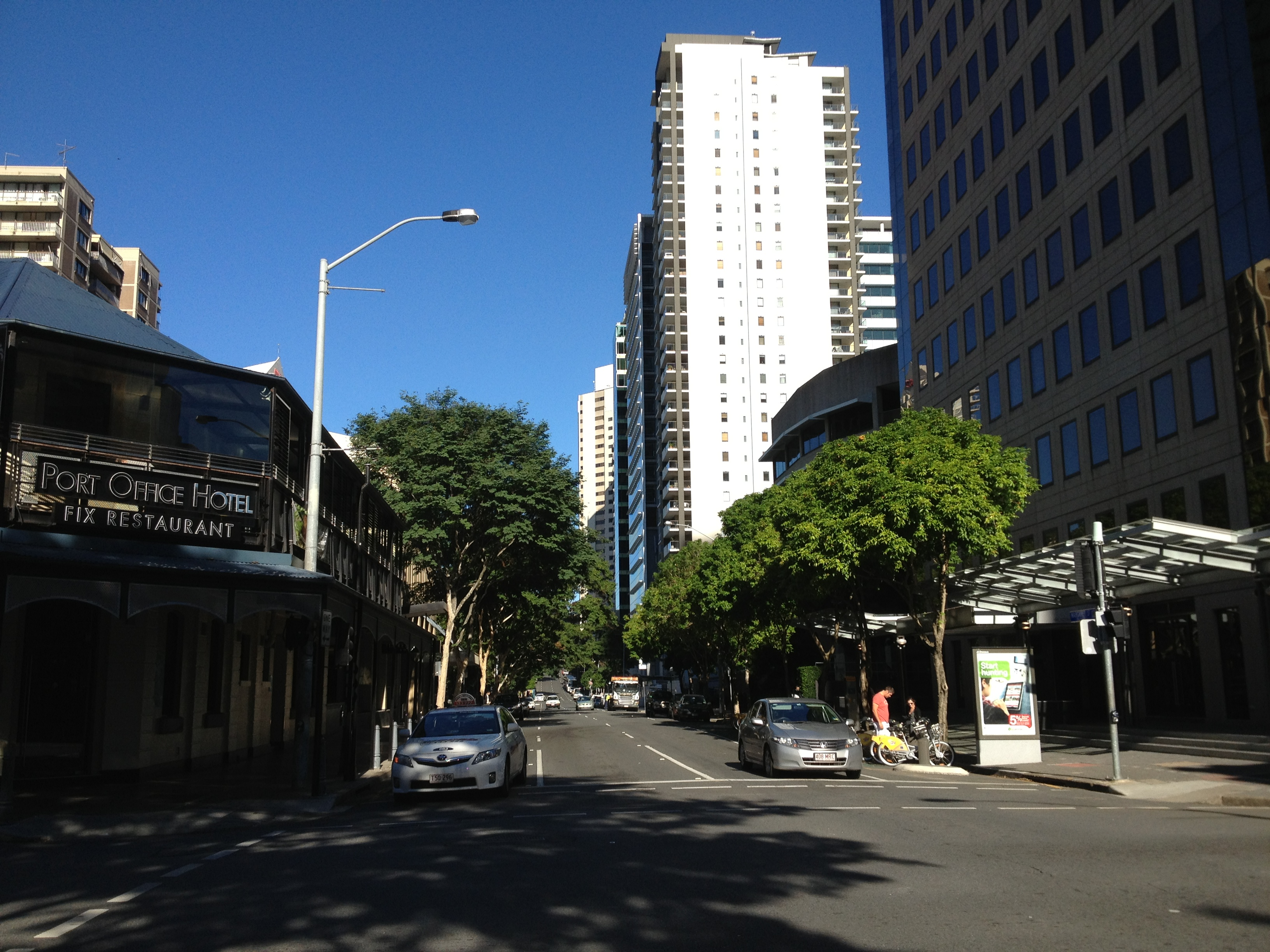
- Margaret Street from Edward Street intersection.
- Coordinates: 27.473425°S 153.027231°E

General information
- Type: Street
- Location: Brisbane

Margaret Street is a major road in the central business district of Brisbane. The street is one of a number that were named after female members of the royal family shortly after the penal colony was settled.

Alice Street lies to the south, while Mary Street runs parallel to the north. Traffic flow along the street is restricted to one direction, towards the north east. From the south an exit ramp from the Riverside Expressway becomes Margaret Street at the William Street intersection.

== Buildings ==
A second approach to the Vision Brisbane residential skyscraper, Brisbane Skytower was built on Margaret Street. Part of the Queen's Wharf, Brisbane project is being built on Margaret Street. Another prominent building on the road is the skyscraper called Mineral House containing offices. Other tall buildings on the street are mostly apartment buildings including the Royal on Park and The Grosvenor.

== History ==
In 1885 the Brisbane Hebrew Congregation built a synagogue on Margaret Street, which still stands today, largely unaltered. In 1889, six attached houses, now known as The Mansions were built on the corner of George Street and Margaret Streets, an area that was once highly sought after because of its prestigious location.

== Heritage listings ==
Margaret Street has a number of heritage-listed sites, including:

- 98 Margaret Street: Brisbane Synagogue
- 125 Margaret Street: Acme Engineering Works (also known as HB Sales Building)
- 129 Margaret Street: Watson Brothers Building
- Sections of Albert St, George St, William St, North Quay, Queen's Wharf Rd: Early Streets of Brisbane

== Major intersections ==
- Riverside Expressway
- William Street
- George Street
- Albert Street
- Edward Street
- Felix Street

== See also ==
- Adelaide Street
- Ann Street
- Charlotte Street
- Elizabeth Street
- Queen Street
