= St Stephens School, Brisbane =

Heritage-listed building in Brisbane, Queensland

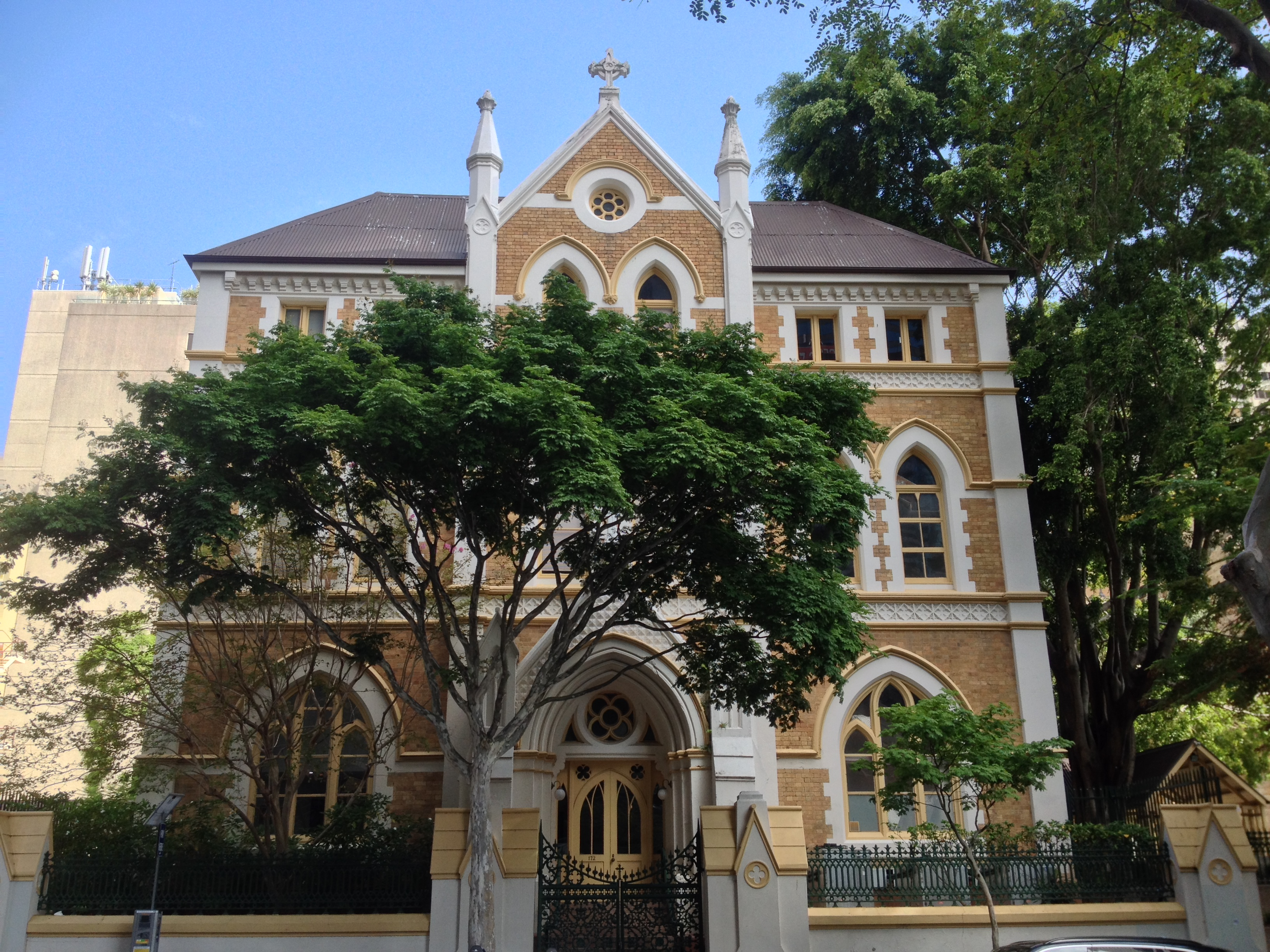
- Former St Stephen's School, 2014

- Location within Queensland Location within Australia
- 27.4691°S 153.0288°E
- Location: 172 Charlotte Street, Brisbane City, City of Brisbane, Queensland, Australia

History
- Design period: 1870s–1890s (late 19th century)
- Built: 1892

Site notes
- Architect: John Ibler
- Architectural style: Gothic Revival

Queensland Heritage Register
- Official name: St Stephens School
- Type: state heritage (built)
- Designated: 21 October 1992
- Reference no.: 600106
- Significant period: 1892–1965 (historical); 1890s (fabric); 1890s–1960s (social)
- Significant components: school/school room, fence/wall – perimeter
- Builders: Thomas Rees

St Stephens School is a heritage-listed former Roman Catholic school at 172 Charlotte Street, Brisbane City, City of Brisbane, Queensland, Australia. It was designed by architect John Ibler and built in 1892 by Thomas Rees. It was added to the Queensland Heritage Register on 21 October 1992.

== History ==
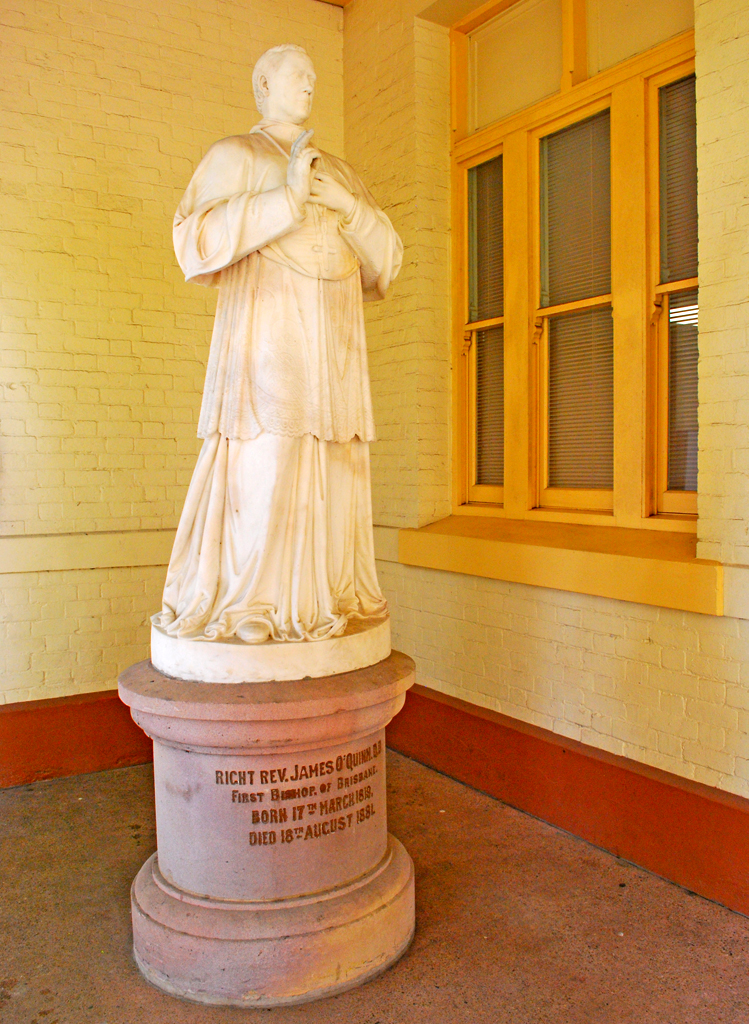
Statue of Bishop Quinn, 2012

The school stands on land which was designated for church use in 1847 and officially granted to the Catholic Church in 1849. The very first denominational school in Brisbane had been established in 1845 by the Catholic Church - an indication of early Catholic commitment to education. The aspirations of the Catholic Church and the nature of the 1875 education legislation in Queensland ensured that the early commitment became an enduring feature of Catholic activity, for the church deplored the secular nature of instruction offered in "state" schools and determined to establish its own schools wherever possible. It was within this context that the erection of St Stephens School occurred.

Classes had been conducted in various "second-hand" buildings since 1845, but on 20 March 1892 Archbishop Robert Dunne, a trained teacher, laid the foundation stone for this purpose-built school. A tin capsule containing copies of the three Brisbane daily newspapers and The Australasian was lodged under the stone. John Ibler of Simkin & Ibler, the designers of the building, was present at the ceremony and the contractor, Thomas Rees, made a donation towards the cost of erection. Rees was a prolific building contractor of the period - he built the South East Queensland Water Board Building and Spencers Building.

Construction time was quite brief - on 25 September 1892 the school was blessed by Cardinal Patrick Francis Moran in the presence of a large public gathering. By contemporary standards this was a most impressive school and Cardinal Moran was moved to remark that he hoped "...the people of New South Wales would not allow themselves to be surpassed by those of Queensland in the erection of such schools." The cardinal and several visiting church officials were in Brisbane to open two new churches, lay the foundation stone of another, bless the new school and unveil a statue of the late Bishop James O'Quinn.

The school was run by the Sisters of Mercy as a primary school for girls until its closure in 1965. Subsequently the building was extended and later reopened in 1967 as church administration offices. The 1960s extension was subsequently removed as part of the large St Stephens Cathedral project of the late 1980s.

== Description ==
This three-storeyed school building is built in the Gothic Revival style. It is T-shaped in plan form with the top of the T being the street elevation and the leg of the T extending back into the site. The building is symmetrical from the front elevation. Most window openings have Gothic pointed arches. There are three large openings across the lower level with six smaller windows on the first level, and another six on the upper level. The middle portion of the building has pointed openings whilst those on the wings are rectangular. The central section rises above the wings to a gable containing a small rose window. The building is constructed of brick and has plaster used decoratively around window openings and as horizontal mouldings. The entry is located centrally within an elaborately rendered porch. Verandahs run along either side of the central brick core. Another verandah has been recently added across the rear of the building replacing an unsympathetic brick extension. The masonry and cast iron front fence uses similar detailing to the body of the building and was probably constructed at the same time.

Internally the building has undergone a variety of alterations. The original stair remains to the right of the entry but its timber structure and railing have been painted. On the top level large brackets which support the trusses are exposed, but the ceiling line is not original. A suspended ceiling comes down below the window heads on the ground floor.

== Heritage listing ==
St Stephens School was listed on the Queensland Heritage Register on 21 October 1992 having satisfied the following criteria.

The place is important in demonstrating the evolution or pattern of Queensland's history.

St Stephen's School is significant as evidence of the determination of the Catholic Church to develop its own system of education rather than accept the state's secular education policies.

The place is important because of its aesthetic significance.

St Stephen's School is representative of the imposing architectural style employed in late nineteenth century church schools.

St Stephen's School is an example of an inner city Gothic Revival school that is one of a group of ecclesiastical buildings prominent in this part of the city. St Stephen's School is significant for its contribution, together with other buildings in this ecclesiastical group, to the Charlotte Street streetscape.

The place has a strong or special association with a particular community or cultural group for social, cultural or spiritual reasons.

St Stephen's School is significant for its association with the significant contribution of the Sisters of Mercy to Catholic education in Queensland and as a building held in high esteem by the Catholic community and the wider Brisbane public.
