= Andrew Joseph Thynne =

Australian lawyer and politician

The Hon Andrew Thynne
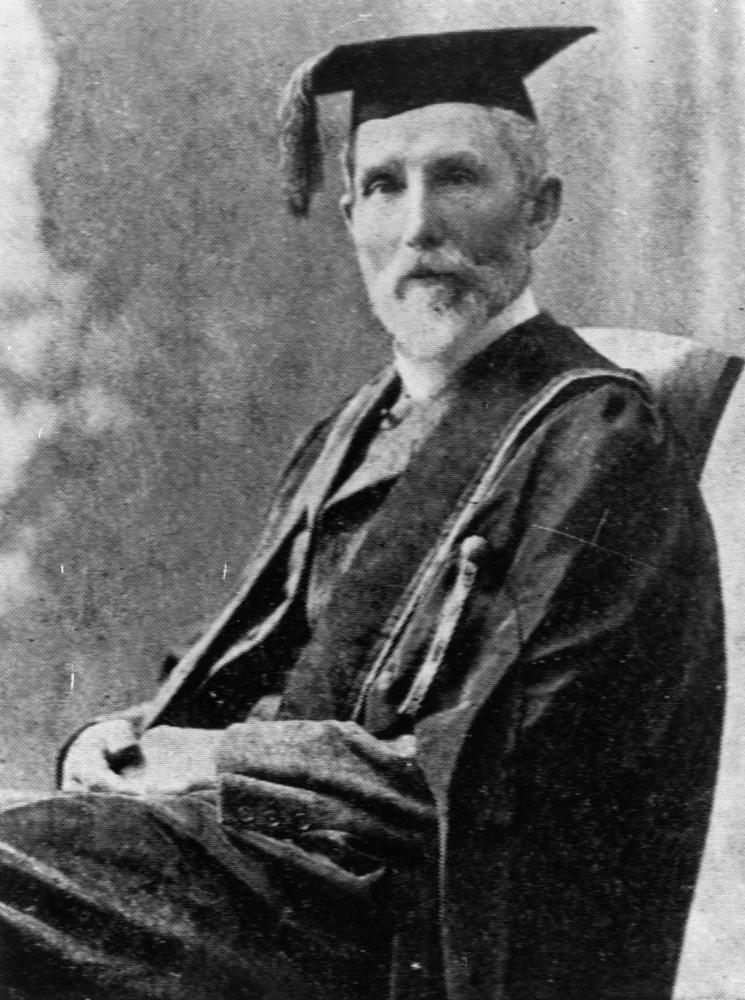
- Thynne in 1911

Member of the Queensland Legislative Council
- In office 26 January 1882 – 23 March 1922

Personal details
- Born: Andrew Joseph Thynne; 30 October 1847 County Clare, Ireland
- Died: 27 February 1927 (aged 79) Brisbane, Queensland, Australia
- Resting place: South Brisbane Cemetery
- Spouse(s): Mary Williamina Cairncross (m.1869 d.1918), Christina Jane Corrie nee Macpherson (m.1922 d.1937)
- Education: Queen's College, Galway
- Occupation: Solicitor, Chancellor of the Queensland University

Andrew Joseph Thynne (30 October 1847 – 27 February 1927) was a lawyer and politician in Queensland, Australia. He was a Member of the Queensland Legislative Council and Attorney-General of Queensland.

== Personal life ==
Thynne was married twice, (1) to Mary, daughter of William Cairncross, and (2) to Christina Jane (née MacPherson, the widow of Leslie Corrie), who survived him along with three sons and five daughters of the first marriage. Thynne was buried in South Brisbane Cemetery.

Thynne Street in the Canberra suburb of Bruce was dedicated in his name.
