= Smithfield Chambers =

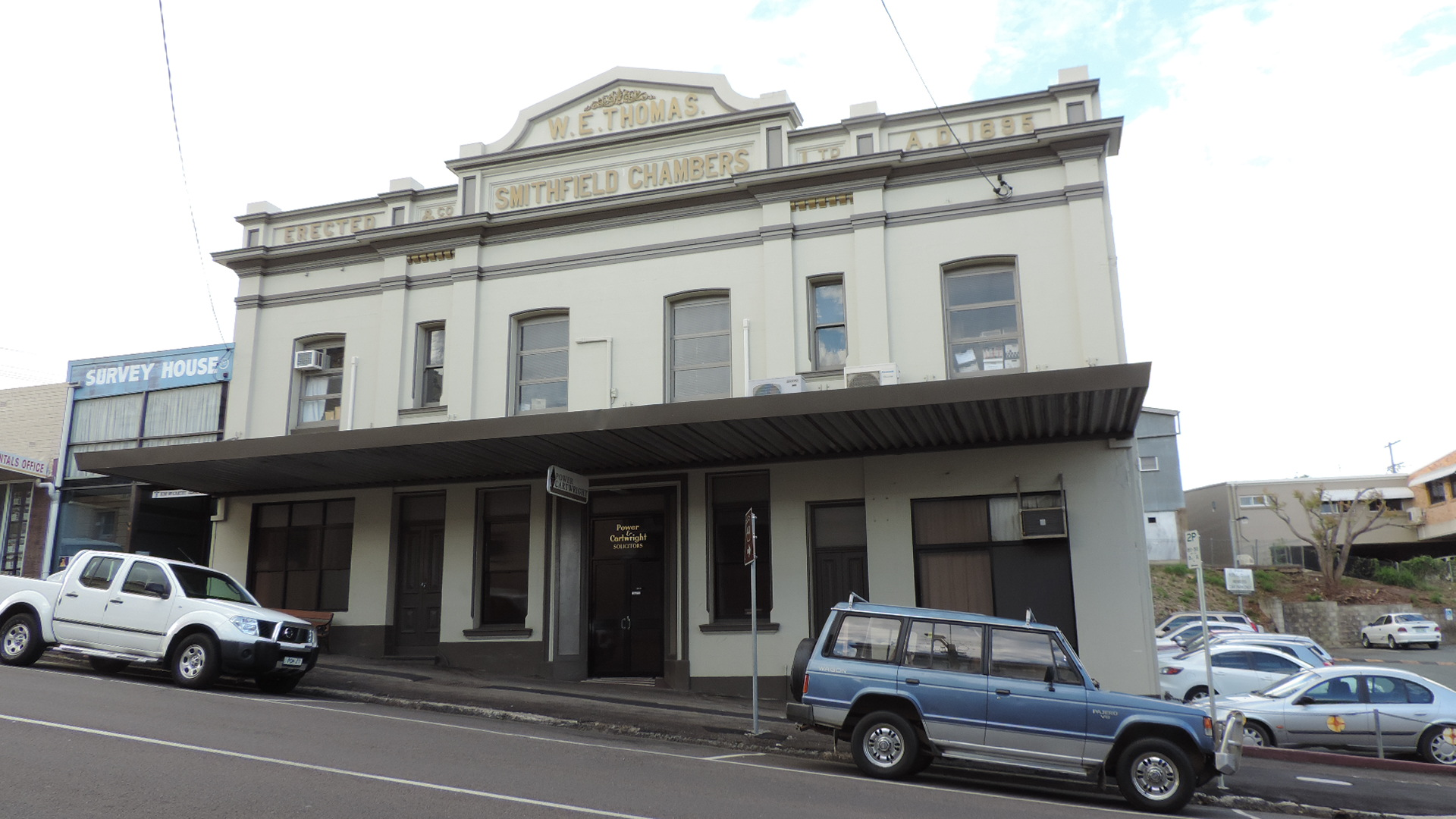
- Smithfield Chambers, 2015

- Location within Queensland Location within Australia
- 26.1884°S 152.6592°E
- Location: 235 Mary Street, Gympie, Gympie Region, Queensland, Australia

History
- Design period: 1870s–1890s (late 19th century)
- Built: 1890s
- Built for: William Evan Thomas

Site notes
- Architect: Leslie Gordon Corrie
- Architectural style: Classicism

Queensland Heritage Register
- Official name: Smithfield Chambers
- Type: state heritage (built)
- Designated: 15 July 2011
- Reference no.: 602777
- Significant period: Late 19th to mid twentieth century
- Significant components: shop/s, laneway, office/s, toilet block/earth closet/water closet, stables
- Builders: William Anthony

Smithfield Chambers is a heritage-listed office building at 235 Mary Street, Gympie, Gympie Region, Queensland, Australia. It was designed by Leslie Gordon Corrie and built in the 1890s by William Anthony. It was added to the Queensland Heritage Register on 15 July 2011.

== History ==
Smithfield Chambers, a two storey rendered brick building in Upper Mary Street Gympie, was built in 1895 for William Evan Thomas, mining secretary and sharebroker.

Gympie (initially called Nashville) was established after the discovery of gold in October 1867 by James Nash in the Upper Mary River district. The new goldfield put Queensland on the map as a significant gold producer, contributing much needed finances to the young colony. By Christmas of 1867, according to the Gold Commissioner, the Gympie field had a population of 4,000 (or over 15,000 according to James Nash). Alluvial deposits were quickly exhausted and from 1868 shallow reef mining occurred.

As it evolved from a hastily established mining settlement, Gympie developed a distinctive character with an irregular street pattern amid a series of valleys and ridges. Development of roads within the township followed the terrain rather than adopting the standard grid pattern that was applied to townships surveyed for settlement, and consequently many roads run along ridgelines with linking roads across valleys and hillsides. Existing buildings and mining homestead leases were accommodated in the first survey of the township in April 1868. By the mid 1870s, the vicinity of Upper Mary Street and Channon St was dominated by government and financial institutions. The early makeshift structures of Gympie gradually gave way to more permanent and substantial public and private buildings.

By the end of the 1870s, an intensive phase of underground reef mining was underway, facilitated by the injection of share-holding capital into mining companies for machinery and employees. During the early 1880s, mines began yielding large amounts of gold, marking a new era of wealth and prosperity for Gympie. The increase in production led to an upsurge in company formation on a massive scale. This growth led to the 1884 formation of the Gympie Stock Exchange, specialising completely in providing facilities for the transfer of shares of mining companies. The presence of sharebrokers engaged in share trading at the Gympie Stock Exchange and of mining secretaries involved in the administration of mines were the natural consequence.

Mining secretaries ensured that the mining company they represented complied with relevant legislation and regulation, and they kept board members informed of their legal responsibilities. Mining secretaries were the company's named representative on legal documents, and it was their responsibility to ensure that the company and its directors operated within the law. It was also their responsibility to register and communicate with shareholders, to ensure that dividends were paid and company records maintained, such as lists of directors and shareholders, and annual accounts.

During the 1880s and 1890s Gympie was Queensland's second and then third biggest gold producer (after Mount Morgan overtook it in 1887). During this period gold production contributed between 21.61 and 35.53 percent of Queensland export income. The influx of money and the resultant yield of gold at Gympie were reflected in the redevelopment of upper Mary Street during the 1880s and 1890s with substantial commercial buildings such as banks and company secretary and brokers' offices. Several fires - in 1877, 1881 and 1891 - razed most of the earlier timber buildings in upper Mary Street and accelerated this transformation.

While major floods and the economic depression affected the Gympie goldfield in the early 1890s, a rapid expansion in mining activity occurred during 1894. At the end of 1893, 58 leases embraced an area of 892 acres (361ha) and 78,978 ounces (2.24 tonnes) of gold bullion was produced. By the end of 1894 there were 80 leases covering 1,354 acres (548ha) and 111,168 ounces of gold bullion (3.15 tonnes) was produced, the biggest year of production of the 1890s.

It was within this context of growth and prosperity that Smithfield Chambers was built in 1895 by William Evan Thomas, mining secretary and sharebroker. Thomas was born in Pembrokeshire, Wales in 1854. A builder by trade, Thomas arrived in Brisbane in 1885, where he started business as a building contractor before eventually working for Hall's Mercantile Agency. After visiting Gympie in the early 1890s, Thomas moved to the township and commenced business as a mining secretary and sharebroker. Although Thomas had no experience in gold mining he soon became a very successful operator, floating a number of new mines in the eastern portion of the goldfield, attracting investors from Australia and abroad. By the end of 1895 WE Thomas and Co. acted as secretaries for 28 of the 100 mining companies of Gympie, the largest provider of these services.

In November 1894 Thomas purchased freehold land adjoining Gympie's Stock Exchange from Matthew Mellor for £1,000 cash. At this time the site featured timber buildings occupied by a chemist and fruiterer, and mining brokers. Thomas engaged Brisbane architect Leslie Gordon Corrie to design a block of offices and shops. Born in Hobart in 1859, Corrie trained as an architect in Tasmania and worked in private practice and for government. In 1886, he established a private practice in Brisbane and was appointed architect to the Queensland Deposit Bank and Building Society. In 1888–1892 he was in partnership with his former master Henry Hunter. From 1898 to 1905 he was in partnership with GHM Addison as Addison and Corrie. Corrie was a foundation member and long-time councillor of the Queensland Institute of Architects, elected a fellow in 1889 and President from 1906 to 1908.

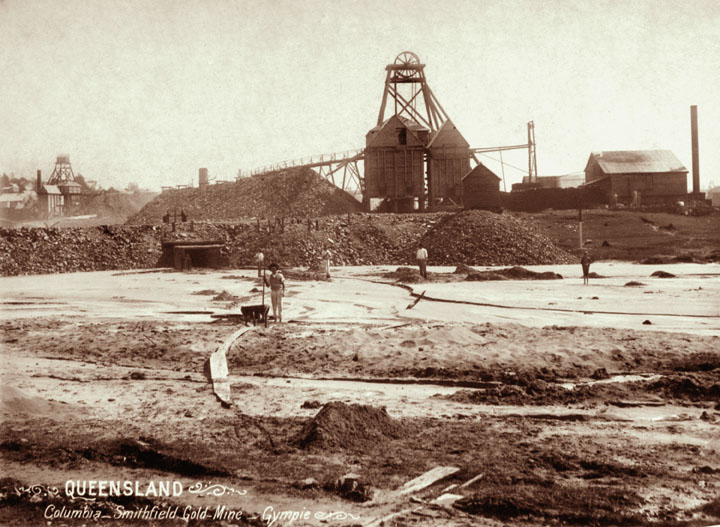
Smithfield Gold Mine, circa 1897

Before construction Thomas had already decided on the name of the building - "Smithfield Chambers", in honour of one of Gympie's most successful early mines, the Smithfield which began operating in 1867. Corrie advertised for tenders to erect the building during February 1895. By early March, William Anthony, of Brisbane (builder of the 1888 Smellie and Co Warehouse in Brisbane) was awarded the building contract for £2,500, exclusive of the strong room and doors, with a requirement to have the work completed by July.

Thomas' proposed internal layout for Smithfield Chambers was described in the Gympie Times in late 1894. On the ground floor there were two shops, one at either side, and the centre had a suite of offices facing the street on each side of the hall, with clerks' rooms and a boardroom at the rear. On the first floor there was a suite of three offices on the eastern side, accessed by a separate staircase. The other side of the first floor was divided into five offices and a large boardroom. Each suite of offices was provided with a strong room (of the four strongrooms, three are still extant).

When completed, Smithfield Chambers, a two storey rendered brick building designed in a classical idiom was one of the largest and most prominent buildings on upper Mary Street. Thomas reinforced his commercial presence on the streetscape by prominently wording the parapet with "Smithfield Chambers" and "W.E. Thomas & Co., mining secretary". The building also included a first floor verandah and street awning. Among the earliest occupiers of the building were Mr J Nicholson, who operated as a tobacconist and hairdresser in one of the shop spaces, consulting engineer Brunel Kay and mining secretaries and agents Maxey and Moodie.

In 1899 Thomas sold Smithfield Chambers to JB Charlton, a stockbroker and in 1902 ownership passed to John Donovan, a mining speculator. Gold production in Queensland peaked in 1903, due largely to a final burst of production at Gympie, which was followed by a 60 percent decrease in production between 1903 and 1913 as the three major Queensland goldfields (Charters Towers, Gympie and Mount Morgan) declined simultaneously. The Gympie field passed through its most profitable period from 1901 to 1906 and in 1903 produced its peak annual output of 146,000 fine ounces (surpassing Mount Morgan that year). After 1906 the decline that began in 1904 accelerated and by 1925 the last of the big mines had ceased production, ending a 50-year phase of deep reef mining in Gympie.

In 1930 Charles Bright became owner of Smithfield Chambers. The building's association with gold mining continued through its occupation by Gympie's Stock Exchange Club. The Club had moved into Smithfield Chambers from the Australian Joint Stock Bank building opposite in 1923, which had been used as the Stock Exchange from 1902 to 1922. The club initially used the ground floor, and their premises consisted of a bar, reading room, three card rooms and two offices in 1937. During the early 1930s the Gympie branch of the Country Women's Association held their meetings at the chambers. The top floor was occupied by spirit merchants in 1957, and in 1958 the Stock Exchange Club took over three rooms on the first floor for a library, reading room and dinette. The club closed in 1963, and in 1964 Jack Cartwright, of Power and Cartwright solicitors, purchased the building. Power and Power, the firm predating Power and Cartwright, may have operated from the building from the 1950s. A photo from 1973 shows that the verandah had been removed by this time and John McCarthy Real Estate occupied the shop space to the left of the building. The current office fit-out dates from the 1970s, when an internal light well at the centre of the building was enclosed, and an awning replaced the verandah (post-1973).

The rear yard of the building, which is level with the rear of first floor, contains the remains of a brick stable on the northwest side, and a rendered brick earth closet block, with eight cubicles and an access lane to the rear. While no documentary evidence has confirmed LG Corrie as the architect of the block, Corrie is known to have had a particular interest in sanitation, as Mayor of Brisbane in 1901 and as a lecturer in sanitary engineering in 1906.

The Gympie Municipal Council first introduced by-laws relating to the erection and maintenance of earth closets in 1883. Initially only certain areas of the municipality (including Mary Street) were required to conform to provisions. In areas where earth closets were made mandatory, pit systems were filled in and existing toilets were required to be rebuilt or altered. Each earth closet was fitted with a box or other vessel "for the reception of nightsoil or other filth" and placed conveniently for removal. Earth closets were also required to be furnished with "a suitable receptacle for the storage of a quantity of dry earth for deodorising purposes". People engaged in the removal of nightsoil were required to pay an annual license fee and could only operate between eleven at night to five in the morning. From 1885 the council operated its own nightsoil service. By 1894 the whole of the municipality was under the provisions of the by-laws. In 1895, the by-laws were further extended and every nightman was required to keep a register of all premises visited, to be submitted monthly to the council inspector. Nightsoil service charges at this time were one shilling and six pence for a single pan and one shilling and three pence for additional pans.

Smithfield Chambers is still used by Power and Cartwright. The ground floor, including the former shop spaces, is used as offices, and the first floor is only partially utilised. The two staircases from the street level to the first floor still exist, although only the northwest one is in use. A large space at the centre rear of the first floor has been partitioned. There are still two strong rooms on the ground floor, and one on the first floor.

== Description ==
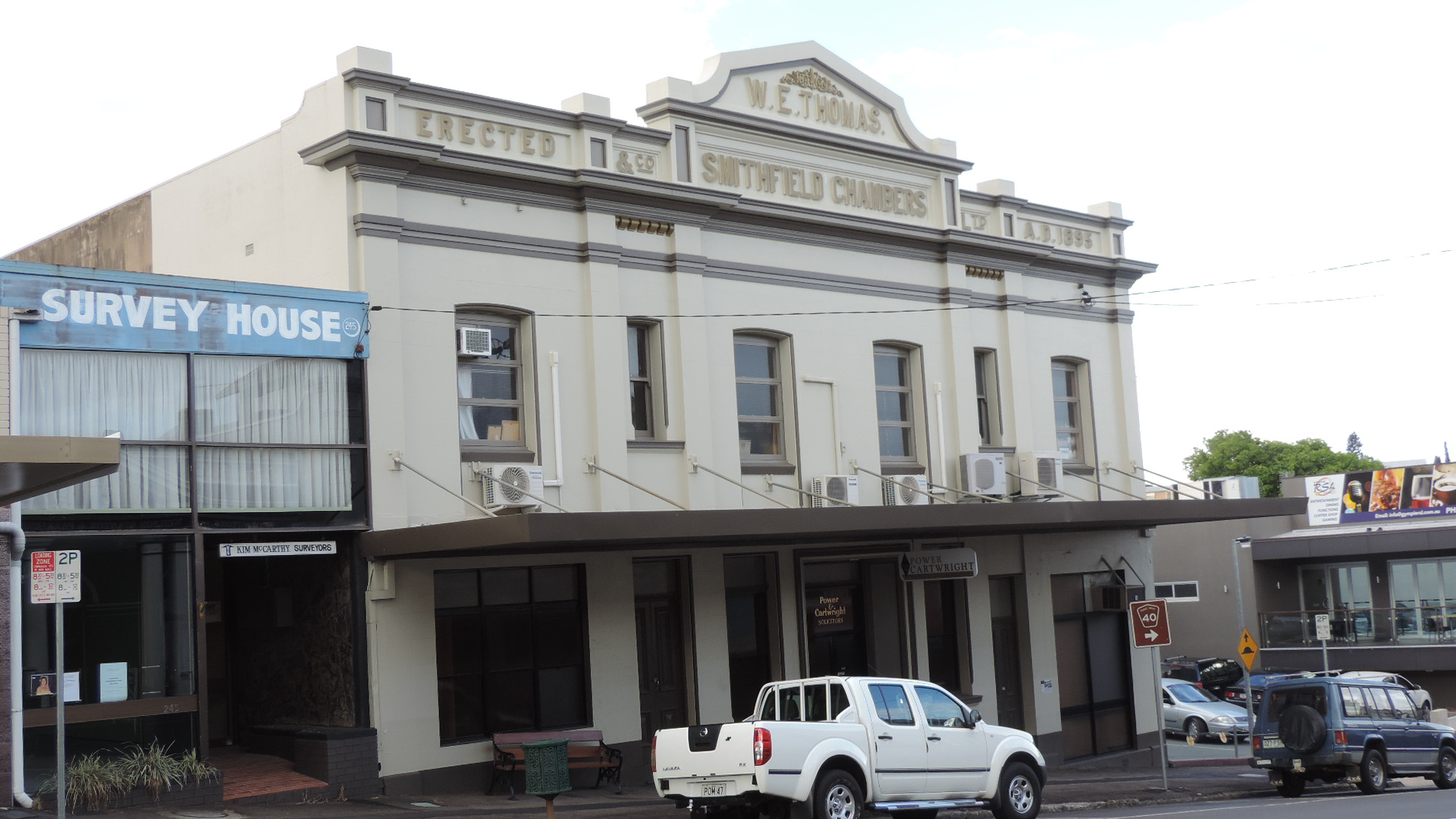
Smithield Chambers, 2015

An austere, two storey, rendered brick building in a classical idiom, Smithfield Chambers stands prominently on a sloping site to the northeast side of upper Mary Street, Gympie. Stables and a row of earth closets stand to the rear of the property.

The rendered and painted front elevation is symmetrical about a central bay which at street level comprises a recessed main entrance with splayed reveals forming a shallow porch opening into the offices beyond. The entrance, now housing a set of modern steel framed doors, is flanked by sash windows with projecting moulded sills and chamfered surrounds enriched with roll mouldings. Pairs of narrow, cricket bat panelled timber doors are to each side of the sash windows and the former shop fronts to the outer bays are now infilled with fixed glass lights to the uphill side and glazed sliding doors to the downhill. At the upper level the five bays, defined by pilasters, are punctuated by window openings to the offices and stairwells beyond. Unified by the depressed arched window heads running level, the four larger openings each housing three hopper windows mark the offices and two smaller full pane sash windows mark the stairwells. A heavy projecting cornice crowns the pilasters below a blank parapet screen bearing the wording "erected / & co. / Smithfield Chambers / Ltd / A.D. 1896". This is topped by a central decorative gable panel bearing the wording "W.E. Thomas" below a floral enrichment. A suspended metal awning extends over the footpath.

At the rear the building sits within the excavated hillside retained by a rendered masonry wall framing narrow passageways to the sides and rear of the building. The stepped rear elevation is dominated by the projecting, curved roof steel framed balcony to the middle of the upper level. The upper and lower levels are punctuated by timber doors with fanlights and full pane sash windows. The blank southeast and northwest elevations, step back at the rear accommodating a narrowing of the building footprint.

Rectangular in plan, the building is laid out around a small two storey light well, accommodating office suites around the light well and shops to the outer edges. The light well is now enclosed but perimeter walls survive with elements including sash windows to the northwest and an arched opening to the northeast at the ground floor and sash windows opening from the boardroom and front and side offices on the first floor.

The ground floor accommodates offices to the middle separated from the former shop spaces by stairwells rising to the upper level. The light well separates the front offices, now open plan, from the rear offices which are partitioned off a central corridor. A substantial strong room, notable for its heavy metal door and concrete floor, stands to the east corner and a smaller strong room is accommodated beneath the southeast stairwell. The two roomed shop spaces are rectangular in plan, the northwest now partitioned into offices. Both shops have rear doors exiting to the narrow passageways to the sides of the building. An acoustic tile ceiling has been inserted throughout the ground floor. A recent concrete block extension accommodating toilets stands to the rear on the ground floor.

The first floor accommodates two suites of offices. The suite to the southeast consists of two offices and a strong room working off a corridor accessed from the dedicated stair from Mary Street. This strong room is also notable for its heavy metal door and concrete floor. The office suite to the northwest comprises two rooms to Mary Street and three rooms along the northwest side working off the corridor arrived at from the stair from Mary Street. This corridor runs to the boardroom extending across the rear with a small room opening off to the west corner. On the first floor, internal masonry walls are plastered and room partitions are timber framed and lined, some also have panels of opaque textured glazing. Ceilings are lined with tongue and groove timber boards, have moulded timber cornices and decorative ceiling roses. Original cedar door and window joinery, skirtings and architraves survive throughout. The boardroom is notable for its joinery including the painted French windows with fanlight to the balcony flanked by large full pane varnished cedar sash windows and full pane sash windows to the former light well to the southwest. This room now has a lower plain plaster ceiling and a three-quarter height partition to the southeast. The hopper windows to the Mary Street side offices do not have internal sills, reflecting the removal of earlier French windows to these openings.

A small metal framed bridge travels from the rear balcony over the retaining wall to a grassed rear yard which accommodates stables to the northwest side and a row of earth closets to the northeast.

Open to the front, the stables have perimeter brick walls to three sides, rendered to the exterior and face brick to the interior. Semi- circular fixed timber louvred openings run along the northeast wall and a line of rectangular fixed timber louvres runs along the upper northwest wall. The timber framing and cladding of the four bay structure are generally in a state of collapse. The end bays have timber floors supported by timber stumps, the middle bays have timber framed and lined partitions to an earth floor, some roof framing and corrugated iron roof cladding remain.

Built on sloping ground with the cubicles stepping down, the eight earth closets are enclosed by three perimeter brick walls with rendered brick exteriors and painted brick interiors. The cubicles are sheltered by a skillion roof clad with corrugated iron and have rectangular fixed timber louvred windows with sills to the upper part of the northeast wall. The lower openings to this wall have small timber doors providing access to the pans. Some cubicles retain timber boxes and all retain timber doors.

The easement from Nash Street gives access to the rear of the earth closets and stables. There are a number of self-sown trees and the ground to the easement path and yard is uneven.

== Heritage listing ==
Smithfield Chambers was listed on the Queensland Heritage Register on 15 July 2011 having satisfied the following criteria.

The place is important in demonstrating the evolution or pattern of Queensland's history.

Smithfield Chambers is important in demonstrating the evolution of gold mining at Gympie, a major contributor to the wealth of Queensland for approximately 60 years from 1867. As Gympie gold production shifted from shallow to deep reef mining from the mid-1870s, this change was reflected in the erection of more permanent and elaborate buildings in the town centre. The building illustrates the growth, wealth and confidence of the Gympie goldfield in the 1890s. For nearly 70 years the building was intimately associated with the mining industry - from its earliest function of accommodating mining secretaries to the housing of the Gympie Stock Exchange Club from 1923 to 1963.

The place demonstrates rare, uncommon or endangered aspects of Queensland's cultural heritage.

The row of earth closets to the rear of Smithfield Chambers is important as a rare surviving example of an early sanitary system that was once common but is now obsolete.

The place is important in demonstrating the principal characteristics of a particular class of cultural places.

Designed to stand prominently in the commercial district of a booming gold mining town and retaining major design elements, including discreet office suites, boardroom, strong rooms, stables and earth closets, Smithfield Chambers is important in illustrating the layout and operation of a mining secretaries' building.

The row of earth closets to Smithfield Chambers is a fine example of this type of sanitary facility, demonstrated by its layout and siting, and in its retention of major design elements including discreet cubicles with pan service doors, boxes and a service easement.
