= Willmore =

Willmore may refer to:

== People ==
- Ben Willmore, American photographer and technology writer
- Henrietta Willmore (1842–1938), Australian musician and suffragette
- Ian Willmore (1958–2020), British activist
- James Tibbits Willmore (1800–1863), British engraver
- Jeff Willmore (born 1954), Canadian artist
- Micheál Mac Liammóir (1899–1978), British–Irish actor, writer, painter etc.
- Norman Willmore (1909–1965), politician in Alberta, Canada
- Patrick Willmore (1921–1994), British seismologist
- Thomas Willmore (1919–2005), English geometer
- William Erwin Willmore (either 1844 or 1845–1901), English-born American teacher and the founder of a colony

== Other ==
- The Willmore, an apartment building in California
- Willmore Wilderness Park, Alberta, Canada

== See also ==
- Willmore energy in differential geometry
  - Willmore conjecture on toruses
- Wilmore (disambiguation)
