= Henrietta Willmore =

Australian musician and pianist

- Born: Henrietta Pervical; 27 March 1842; London, England
- Died: 22 August 1938 (aged 96); Wynnum, Brisbane, Queensland, Australia
- Other name: Madame Mallalieu
- Spouses: Alfred Mallalieu (m. 1862; died 1884) Walter Graham Willmore (m. 1885, estrangement)

Henrietta Willmore (27 March 1842–22 August 1938) was an Australian pianist and musician who was popular in the late 19th century. She was also a suffragette, active in the Queensland Women's Suffrage League among other organisations.

== Biography ==
Willmore née Pervical was born in London, England on 27 March 1842. In 1862 she married Alfred Mallalieu with whom she had five children. She and Alfred emigrated to Australia in 1864. She made her musical debut in Brisbane in 1866. Willmore began her teaching career in 1867. She needed the income from teaching because of her husband's insolvency and his subsequent death, in January 1884.

Willmore was a church organist at St John's Pro-Cathedral from 1882 to 1885 and subsequently married her teacher Walter Graham Willmore in 1885. She played at other churches, and pioneered organ recitals and organ-based concerts in Brisbane. In 1892 she played the opening event for the installation of the Willis organ at the Exhibition Building.

Willmore was a suffragette and was active in the Queensland Women's Electoral League, the Queensland Women's Suffrage League, and the Woman's Franchise Association of Queensland. She was a founding member of the Brisbane Women's Club.

Willmore was president of the Toowong branch of the Belgian Relief Fund during World War I, which earned her the "Medailles de la Reine Elisabeth".

Willmore died on 22 August 1938 in Brisbane.

Members of the Willmore Discussion club donated a music chair in her memory to The Women's College of the University of Queensland. The chair was made of maple in 15th century design with back and seat of cowhide. It was carved by Lewis Jarvis Harvey who attended the ceremony where the club president presented the chair to Freda Bage, principal of the college.
