= Thomas Rees (mayor) =

Australian contractor and politician

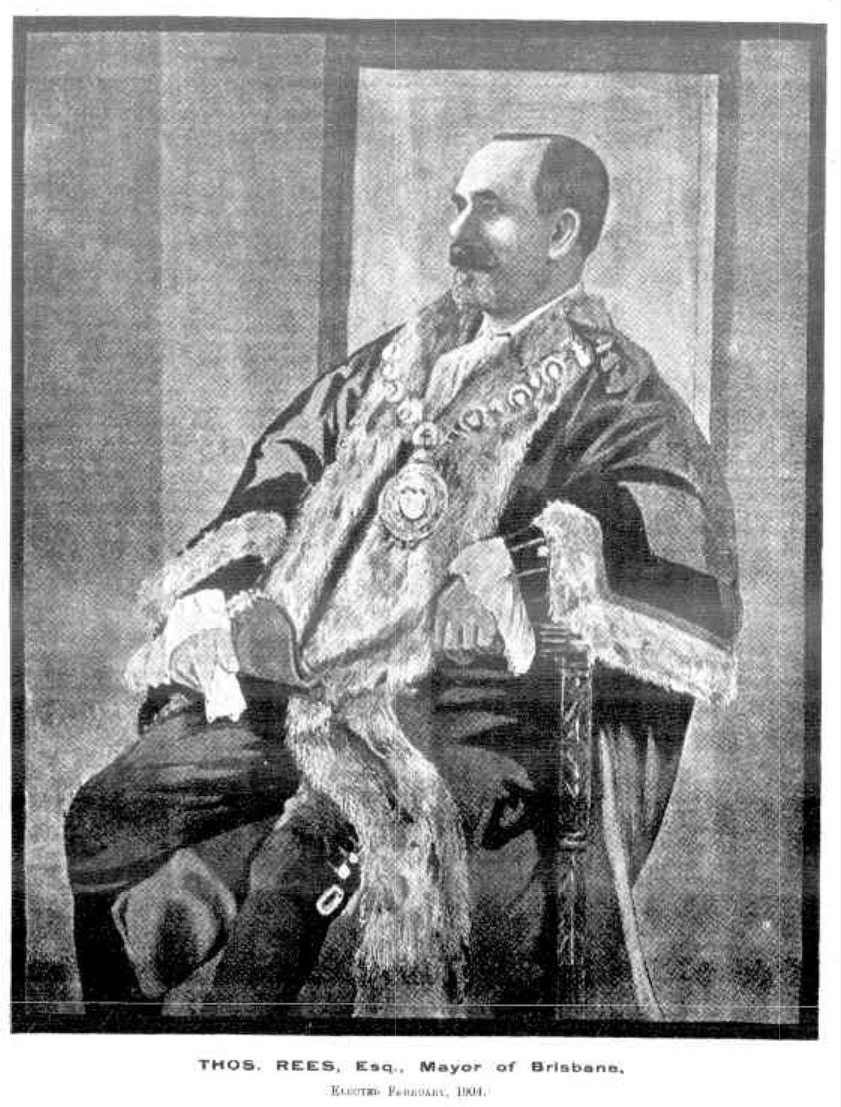
- Thomas Rees, Mayor of Brisbane, 1904

32nd Mayor of Brisbane
- In office 1904–1904
- Preceded by: Leslie Corrie
- Succeeded by: Thomas Proe

Personal details
- Born: Thomas Rees; 9 September 1844 Lydstep, South Pembrokeshire, Wales
- Died: 31 August 1921 (aged 76) Coorparoo, Queensland, Australia
- Resting place: Balmoral Cemetery
- Occupation: Builder

Thomas Rees (1844–1921) was a contractor and politician in Queensland, Australia. He was Mayor of Brisbane in 1904.

== Early life ==
Thomas Rees was born on 9 September 1844 in Lydstep, South Pembrokeshire, Wales, the son of Evan Rees and his wife Elizabeth (née Thomas).

== Career ==
Thomas Rees built the now heritage-listed St Pauls Presbyterian Church in Spring Hill from 1887 to 1889. In 1892 he built the now heritage-listed Roman Catholic St Stephens School in Charlotte Street. He built the now heritage-listed South East Queensland Water Board Building (R Martin & Co Building) at 41 Edward Street, Brisbane City from 1885 to 1886. He built the now heritage-listed Spencers Building at 45–51 Edward Street, Brisbane City from 1889 to 1890. In 1905 he built the now heritage-listed Woolloongabba Post Office(former) at 765 Stanley Street, Woolloongabba.

== Later life ==
Thomas Rees died on 31 August 1921 at his home Lydstep in Coorparoo. He was buried the same day in Balmoral Cemetery.

== See also ==
- List of mayors and lord mayors of Brisbane
