= Wilmore =

Wilmore may refer to:

== Places in the United States ==
- Wilmore, Kansas
- Wilmore, Kentucky
- Wilmore, Pennsylvania
- Wilmore, West Virginia

== People ==
- Barry E. Wilmore, NASA astronaut and United States Navy test pilot
- Larry Wilmore, television producer, writer, comedian, and actor

== See also ==
- Willmore (disambiguation)
