= Christina Jane Corrie =

Australian suffragist

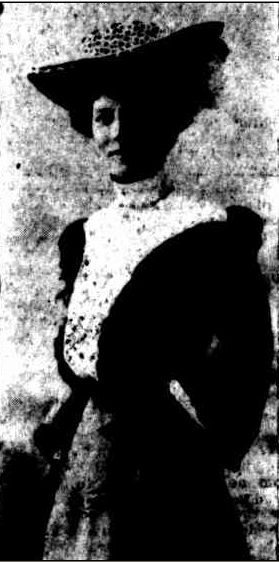
- Christina Corrie, 1903
- Born: Christina Jane MacPherson; 26 July 1867; Helensburg-on-Clyde, Scotland
- Died: 7 May 1937 (aged 69); Brisbane, Queensland, Australia
- Occupation: Suffragist
- Spouses: Leslie Gordon Corrie (m. 1899; died 1918) Andrew J Thynne (m. 1922; died 1927)

Christina Jane Corrie (née MacPherson, later Thynne) (1867–1937) was the founder of the Queensland Women's Electoral League.

== Early life ==
Christina Jane MacPherson was born on 26 July 1867 at Helensburg-on-Clyde, Scotland, the daughter of James Drummond MacPherson.

She married Brisbane architect Leslie Gordon Corrie on 25 March 1899 at St Thomas's Church, Enfield, Sydney.

== Politics ==
Christina Corrie was involved in the National Council of Women of Queensland.

Her husband Leslie Corrie was an alderman and mayor of the Town of Brisbane. As his wife, Christina served as lady mayoress. She took advantage of her public prominence to launch the Queensland Women's Electoral League in 1903 to advance the cause of women's suffrage in Queensland. She was elected its first president on 27 July 1903.

== Later life ==
Following the death of her husband Leslie Corrie on 2 August 1918, she married Andrew Joseph Thynne at St Patrick's Catholic Church, Sydney on 11 October 1922. Thynne died on 27 February 1927.

She died on 7 May 1937 at Brisbane after a long illness. She was not buried with either of her husbands but was instead privately cremated at Mount Thompson crematorium.
