= Margaret Ogg =

Australian feminist advocate (1863–1953)

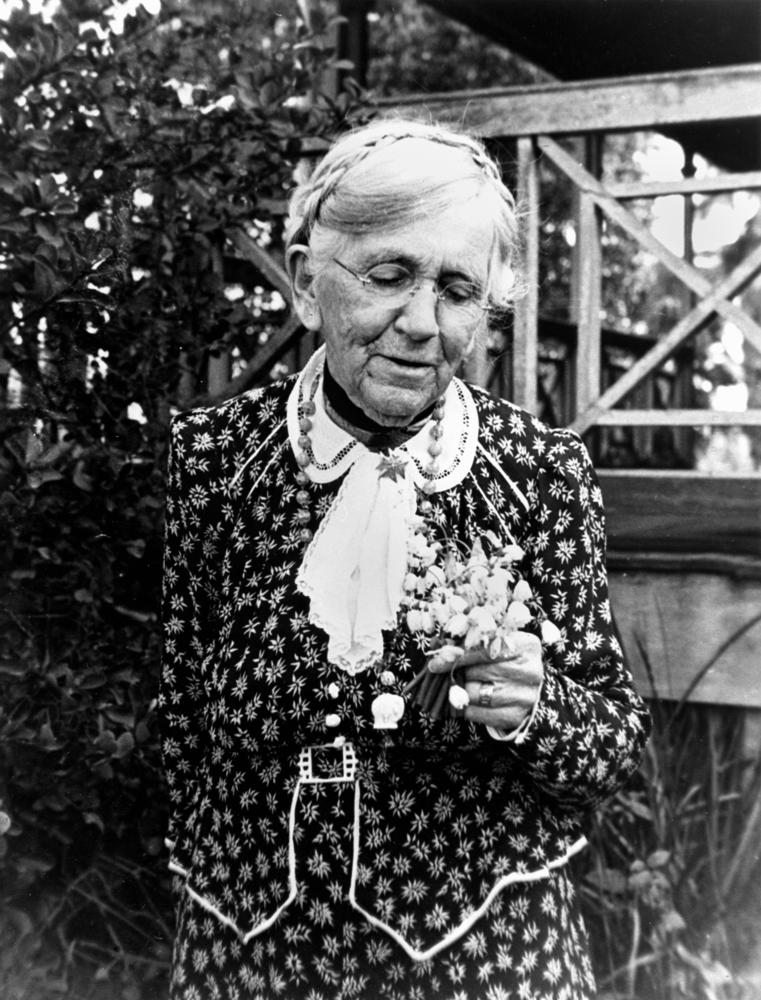
Margaret Ogg

Margaret Ogg (1863–1953) was a feminist advocate in Queensland, Australia. Affectionately known as the 'Old Battle Axe', she was involved in the establishment and leadership of many women's organisations in Queensland, including the Queensland Women's Electoral League (QWEL). Ogg Place in the Canberra suburb of Chisholm is named in her honour.
