= Queensland Women's Electoral League =

Women's suffrage organization in Australia

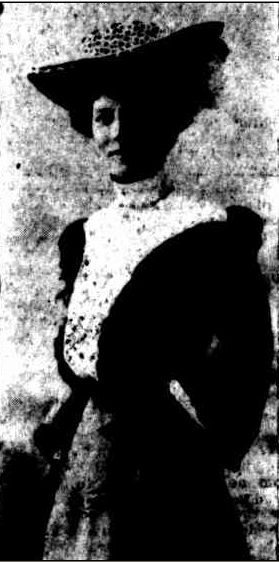
Christina Corrie, 1903

The Queensland Women's Electoral League (QWEL) was an organisation founded in 1903 in Brisbane to advance the cause of women's suffrage in Queensland, Australia.

== History ==
Its founder and first president was Christina Jane Corrie (then the Lady Mayoress of Brisbane, her husband Leslie Corrie being mayor). Margaret Ogg was a prominent and long-time member of the organisation.

In 1908, the League created the Brisbane Women's Club, one of Brisbane's first clubs for women.
