= Leslie Corrie =

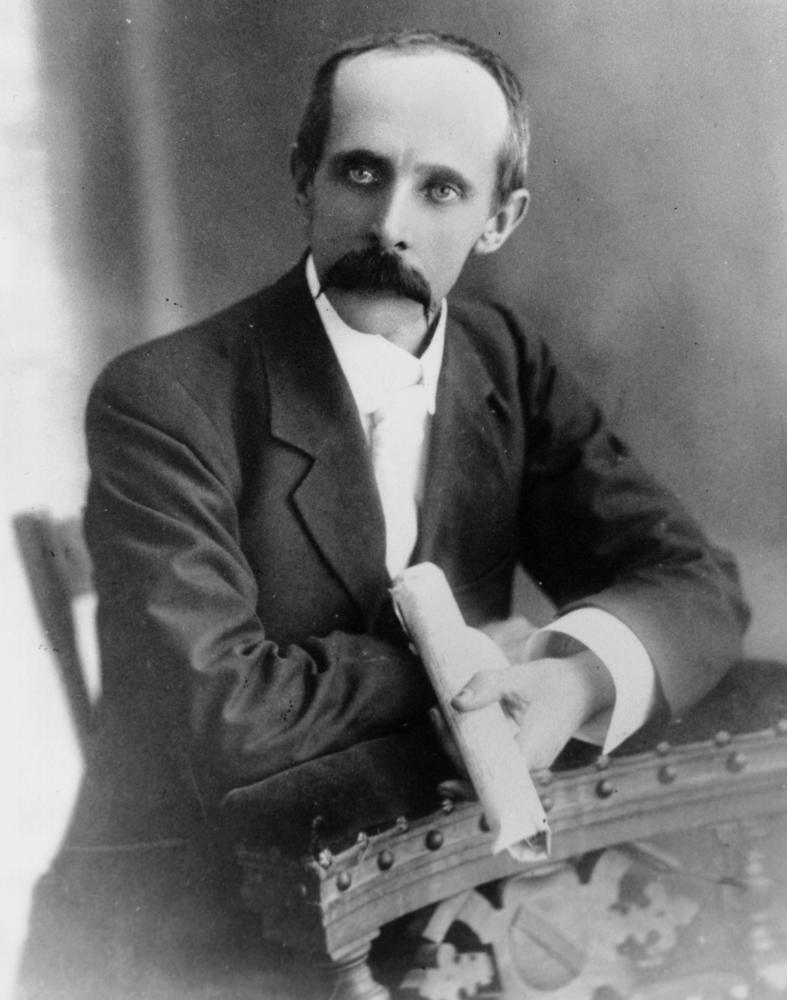
- Leslie Corrie in 1902.

31st Mayor of Brisbane
- In office 1902–1903
- Preceded by: Thomas Proe
- Succeeded by: Thomas Rees

Personal details
- Born: Leslie Gordon Corrie; 1859 Hobart, Tasmania, Australia
- Died: 2 August 1918 (aged 58 or 59) Brisbane, Queensland, Australia
- Resting place: Toowong Cemetery
- Spouse: Christina Jane MacPherson (m.1899 d.1937)
- Occupation: Architect

Leslie Gordon Corrie (1859–1918) was an architect and the mayor of Brisbane, Queensland from 1902 to 1903. A number of his architectural works are now heritage-listed.

== Early life ==
Leslie Gordon Corrie was born in Hobart, Tasmania in 1859, the son of James Afleck Corrie of Kirkcudbright and Mary Campbell of Edinburgh.

He worked as an architect, first in Hobart and then in Launceston. In 1886, he moved to Brisbane. From 1888 to 1892, he was in partnership with his former employer, Henry Hunter trading as "Hunter and Corrie". From 1898 to 1905, he was in partnership with G.H.M. Addison as Addison and Corrie. At other times he had a solo practice.

He was a founding member of the Queensland Institute of Architects in 1887, and was the vice president of the Institute in 1901.

On 25 March 1899, Corrie married Christina Jane Macpherson at St Thomas' Church, Enfield, Sydney.

== Politics ==
Corrie served as an alderman on the Brisbane Municipal Council from 1901 to 1905 and was mayor in 1902 and 1903. During that time, he served on the following committees:

- 1901, 1903: Finance Committee
- 1901, 1904, 1905: Legislative Committee
- 1901: Concert Hall & Organ Committee
- 1901, 1902: Parks Committee
- 1901: Town Hall Committee
- 1901, 1902: Ferries Committee
- 1902, 1905: Works Committee
- 1905: Markets Committee
- 1902, 1903: Board of Waterworks

== Later life ==
Corrie was interested in horticulture, and was a president of the Queensland Acclimatisation Society. He was involved in introducing and trialling many fruits and plants into Queensland, and is credited with the introduction of the custard apple. He was also a fellow of the Linnean Society of London (a society devoted to natural history).

Corrie died in Brisbane on 2 August 1918. He was buried in Toowong Cemetery on 3 August 1918.

== Works ==
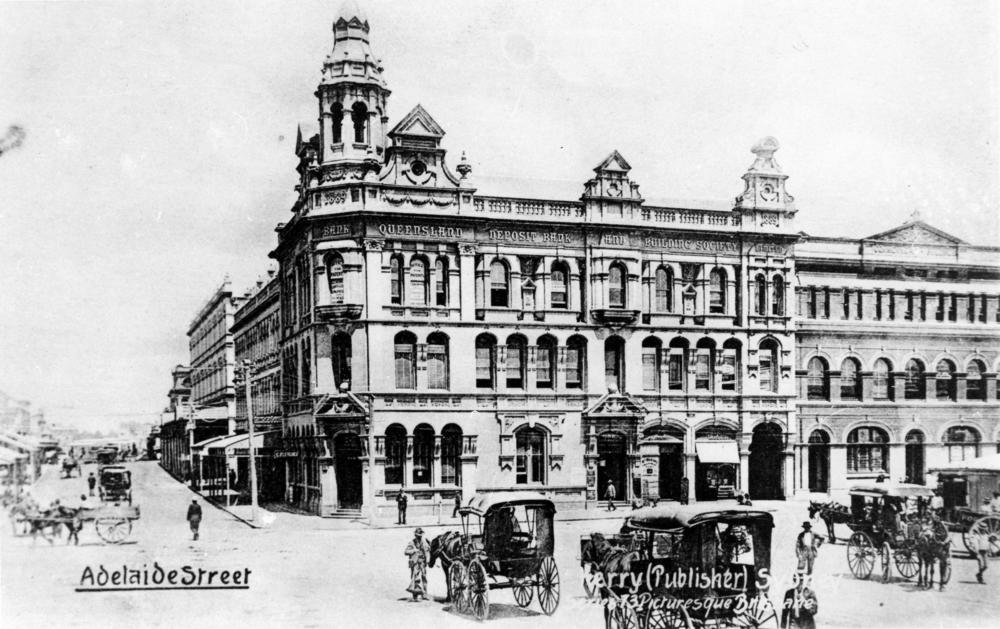
The Queensland Deposit Bank building, 1903.

Working as Hunter and Corrie, his works included:

- 1889: the Paddock Stand (grandstands) at Eagle Farm Racecourse, Brisbane (in collaboration with John H. Buckeridge)
- 1892: extension to Adderton at All Hallows' School, Fortitude Valley, Brisbane
- 1889: Queensland Deposit Bank, corner of Adelaide and Albert streets, Brisbane

Working independently, his works included:

- 1895: Smithfield Chambers, Gympie

Working as Addison and Corrie, his works included:

- 1899:Trustees Chambers, Queen Street, Brisbane
- 1900: guest wing and school room at Franklyn Vale Homestead, Grandchester
- 1900: Moon's Buildings, Adelaide Street, Brisbane
- 1903: Cattle House, Rockhampton

Working independently again, his works included:

- 1916: the residence "Manola" constructed for his brother Alexander Corrie, a stockbroker, Bowen Hills, Brisbane
