= Addison & Corrie =

Addison & Corrie was an architectural partnership of George Henry Male Addison and Leslie Corrie, based in Brisbane, Queensland, Australia.

Together they designed many prominent Queensland buildings, including:

- addition of schoolroom and guest wing, Franklyn Vale Homestead, a heritage-listed homestead at Grandchester, 1900
- Trustees Chambers, a heritage-listed commercial building at 43 Queen Street, Brisbane built in about 1900

== See also ==
- Category:Addison & Corrie buildings
