= R Martin & Co Building =

Heritage-listed building in Brisbane, Queensland

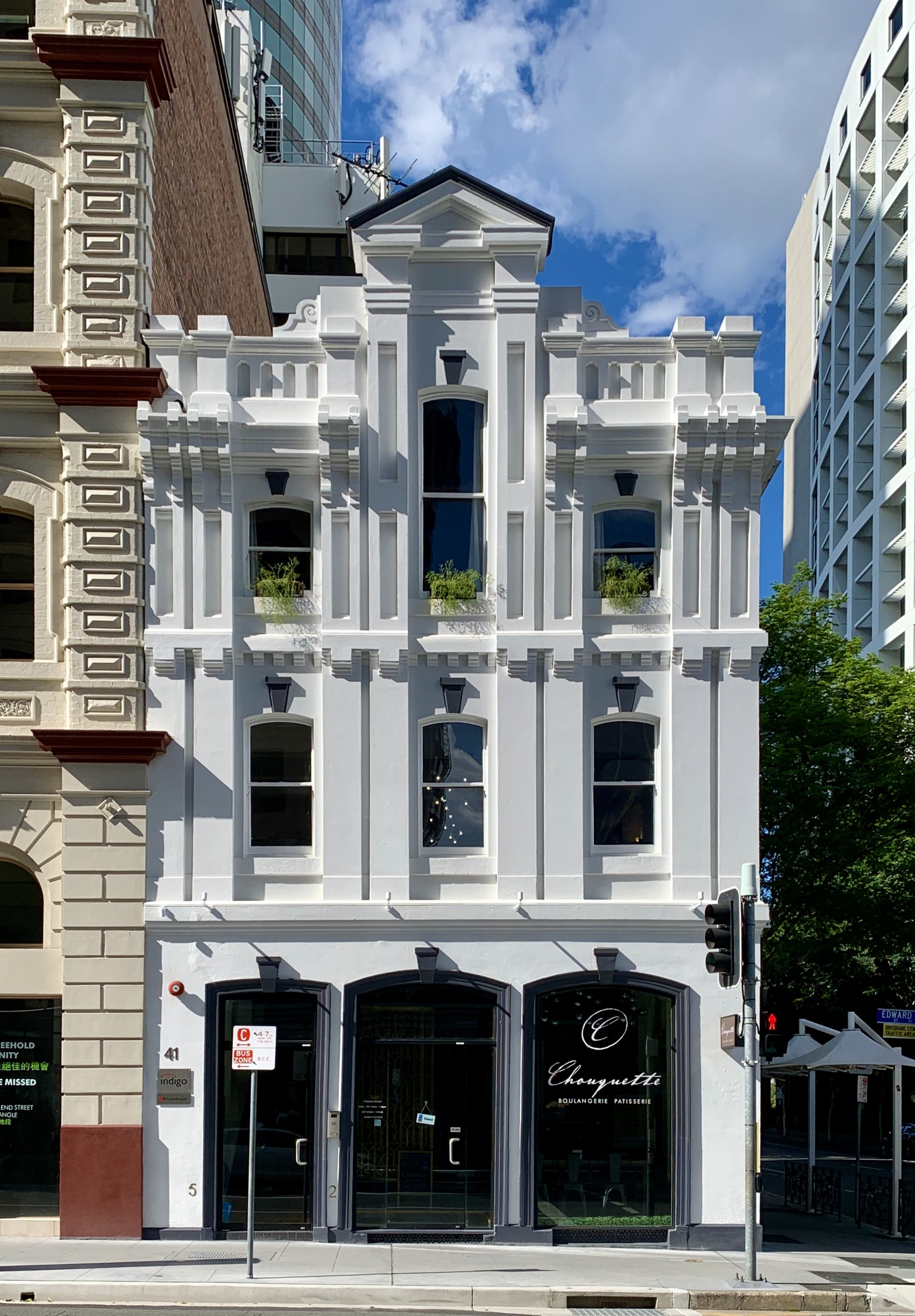
- Edward Street facade, 2020

- Location within Queensland Location within Australia
- 27.4711°S 153.03°E
- Location: 41 Edward Street, Brisbane City, City of Brisbane, Queensland, Australia

History
- Design period: 1870s–1890s (late 19th century)
- Built: 1885–1886

Site notes
- Architect: Alexander Brown Wilson

Queensland Heritage Register
- Official name: South East Queensland Water Board Building, Brisbane & Area Water Board Building, Geedeejay House
- Type: state heritage (built)
- Designated: 21 October 1992
- Reference no.: 600099
- Significant period: 1885–1886 (fabric); 1887–1906, 1913–1914, 1914–1963, 1982 (historical)
- Builders: Thomas Rees

The R Martin & Co Building is a heritage-listed warehouse at 41 Edward Street, Brisbane City, City of Brisbane, Queensland, Australia. It was designed by Alexander Brown Wilson and built from 1885 to 1886 by Thomas Rees. It is also known as the South East Queensland Water Board Building, Brisbane & Area Water Board Building and Geedeejay House. It was added to the Queensland Heritage Register on 21 October 1992.

== History ==
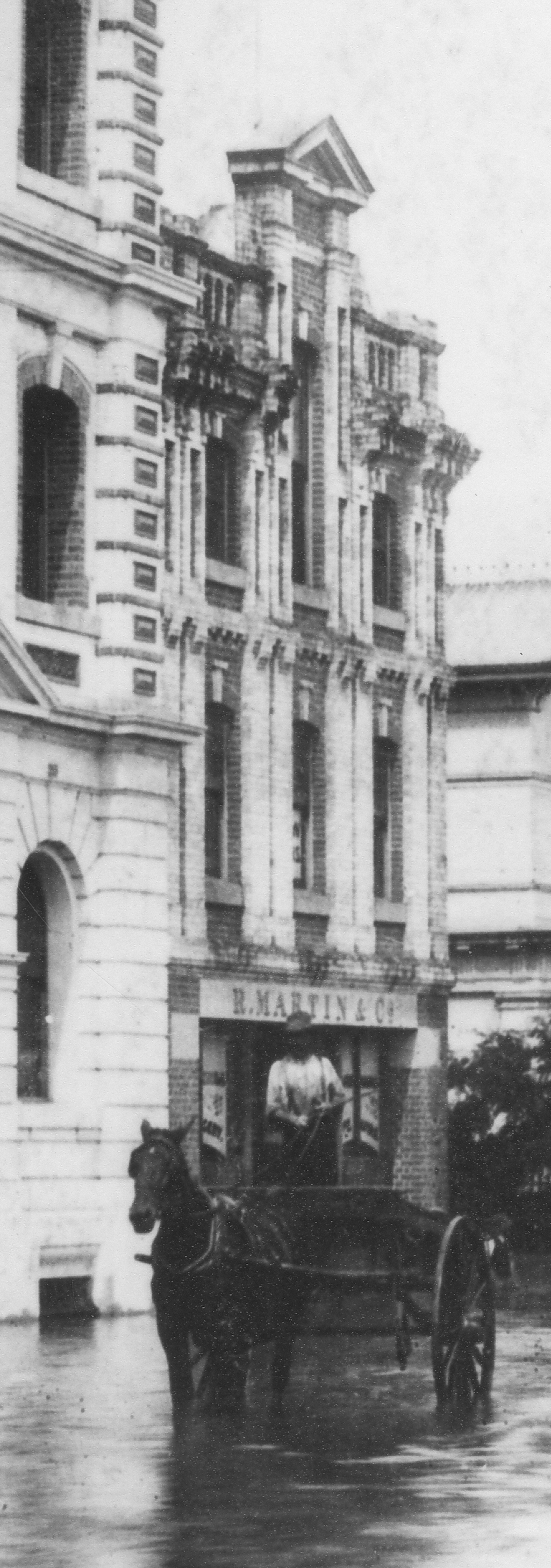
R. Martin & Co building, during the 1890 flood

This warehouse was built between 1885 and 1886, during the 1880s building boom. The site was purchased by Alexander Brand Webster and William Webster, importers of general merchandise, commission, insurance and shipping agents and wholesale stationers in 1885. The warehouse was designed by Alex B Wilson and constructed by Thomas Rees, builder for £3021/11/0.

Largely as a result of its proximity to the Brisbane River, the building was occupied by merchants and indent agents for 77 years. The first occupant, from 1887 to 1906, was Robert Martin, a prominent, well respected businessman in the ship chandlery trade. His business, R Martin & Co, ironmongers, sail makers and riggers was one of the largest in Queensland. From 1909 to 1912 the building was occupied by Sturmfels Stores and in 1913–14 was listed as a Workman's Home run by the Salvation Army. In 1914, EF Broad (Qld Ltd) general merchant, indent agent and supplier to various food manufacturers moved to this building. The company remained there until 1963, having purchased the property in 1956. In 1982 the Brisbane and Area Water Board acquired this site and converted the upper levels into office accommodation. The authority became the South East Queensland Water Board in 1991.

In 2015, the ground floor is occupied by a café.

== Description ==
This is a brick building of three storeys on a base of porphyry (Brisbane tuff) stonework that also has a basement level. The exterior brickwork has been rendered, with the side scored to imitate ashlar work. The Edward Street elevation is symmetrical and divided into three bays, equally spaced. Each floor is defined by a string course, those higher up the facade more ornate than those below. Single windows are centred in a bay on each level and are separated by pairs of pilasters. These are plain at the second level but have been given emphasis at the upper level by the use of recessed panels. The upper-level windows consist of a tall central opening flanked by two shorter ones. Above this taller window is a small triangular pediment with scroll like brackets to each side which helps emphasise the vertical nature of this building on its narrow site. The windows at each level are timber frame double hung sashes.

The Edward Street facade is intact to the upper levels, but the interior has apparently been extensively refurbished. The building does not respond its corner site but has an austere side elevation with some plain openings facing Margaret Street. Plain string courses continue on the Margaret Street facade in line with those on the front of the building. The later full-height extension to the rear of the building has recently been rebuilt.

== Heritage listing ==
The R Martin & Co Building was listed on the Queensland Heritage Register on 21 October 1992 having satisfied the following criteria.

The place is important in demonstrating the evolution or pattern of Queensland's history.

The R Martin & Co Building is a product of the 1880s building boom, the building reflects the development of lower Edward Street as a warehouse precinct.

The place is important in demonstrating the principal characteristics of a particular class of cultural places.

The elaborate facade is typical as a slightly restrained variant of late Victorian ornamentation and detail, which differs from the austerity of later warehouse design.

The place is important because of its aesthetic significance.

The warehouses, including the adjoining Spencers building, provide visual cohesion to the streetscape as they were built to the Edward Street frontage and are similar in scale, height, materials and design features.

This narrow warehouse is a particularly fine example because of its ornate Victorian detailing – especially on the upper levels – which emphasises the building's height.

The place has a special association with the life or work of a particular person, group or organisation of importance in Queensland's history.

This building is significant for its association with architect, AB Wilson, who also designed Webster and Co's warehouse at 146–160 Mary Street, and for the long term occupancy of R Martin & Co, prominent ship chandler and EF Broad Pty Ltd, successful general merchants.
