= Brisbane Women's Club =

Women's organisation in Brisbane, Queensland, Australia

The Brisbane Women's Club is a club for women, one of the first in Brisbane, Queensland, Australia.

== History ==
The club was founded in 1908 as the Progressive Women's Club, an offshoot of the Queensland Women's Electoral League. Its aims were both political and philanthropic. In 1912, it was renamed the Brisbane Women's Club.

On 8–11 August 1922, the club held an open conference for countrywomen in Brisbane's Albert Hall during the Exhibition (a time when many country people visited Brisbane). The conference was opened by Lady Forster, wife of the Australian Governor-General and the Queensland Governor Matthew Nathan attended. The outcome of the conference was to establish the Queensland Country Women's Association.
