= Spencers Building =

Heritage-listed buildings in Brisbane, Queensland

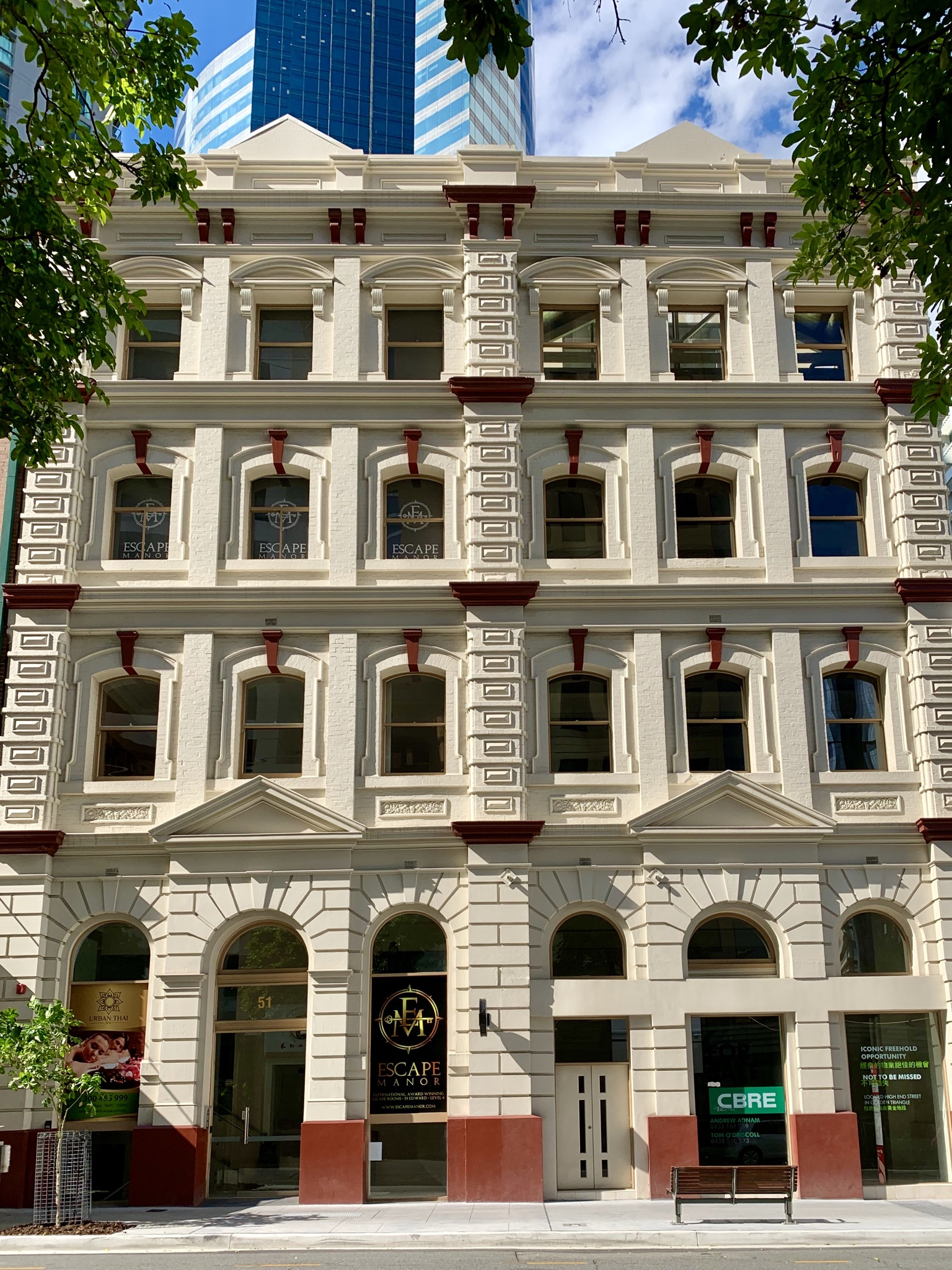
- Spencers Building, 2020

- Location within Queensland Location within Australia
- 27.471°S 153.0299°E
- Location: 45–47 and 49–51 Edward Street, Brisbane City, City of Brisbane, Queensland, Australia

History
- Design period: 1870s–1890s (late 19th century)
- Built: 1889–1890

Site notes
- Architect: Francis Drummond Greville Stanley
- Architectural style: Classicism

Queensland Heritage Register
- Official name: Spencers Building
- Type: state heritage (built)
- Designated: 27 August 1993
- Reference no.: 600100
- Significant period: 1889–1890 (fabric) 1903, 1911, 1913, 1941–1964 (historical)
- Significant components: crane / gantry
- Builders: Thomas Rees

Spencers Building is a pair of heritage-listed warehouses at 45–47 and 49–51 Edward Street, Brisbane City, City of Brisbane, Queensland, Australia. It was designed by Francis Drummond Greville Stanley and built from 1889 to 1890 by Thomas Rees. It was added to the Queensland Heritage Register on 27 August 1993.

== History ==
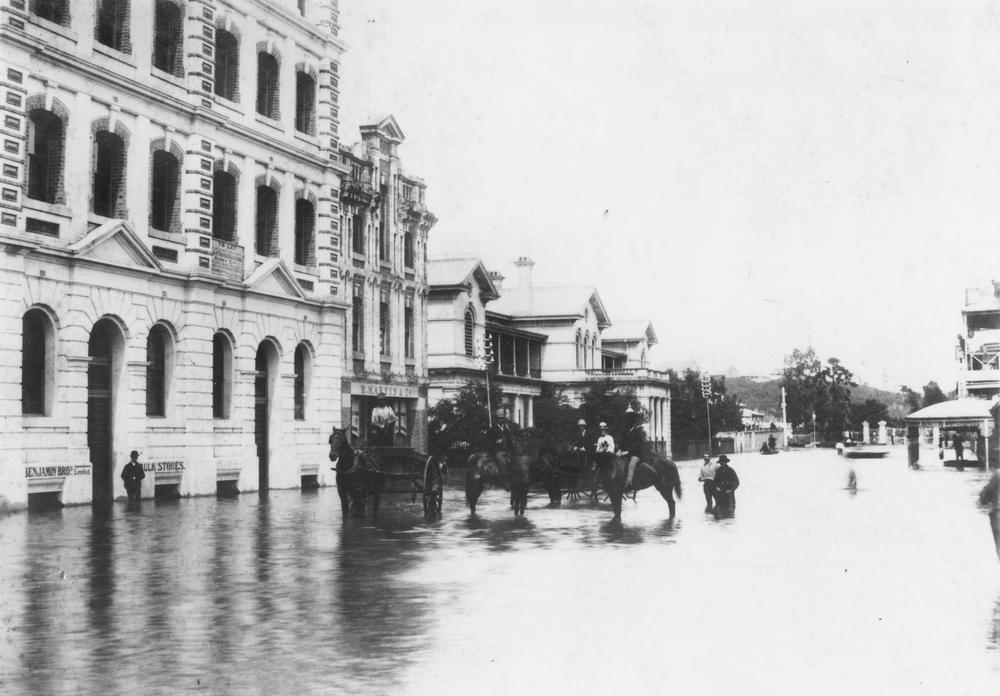
Spencers Building (left) during the 1890 flood with "To Let" sign

The land at the site occupies part of allotments 4 and 5 of section 35 which were acquired respectively by James Donald in 1852 and the well-known Benjamin Cribb in 1854. Cribb and Donald cooperated in the subdivision and resubdivision of the allotments with the land under study passing to William Hood in 1876. Hood was a principal of the firm Hood & Binnie whose iron foundry works were located at the site until 1888. In that year title to the land passed to Frances Sophia Jones wife of the Anglican clergyman Rev Thomas Jones who had accompanied Brisbane's first Anglican Bishop, Edward Tufnell on his arrival in 1860. It was unusual in those times for a married woman to have sole title to this kind of property, but Frances Jones probably did not have ultimate control over it. Until the Married Women's Property Act was introduced in Queensland in 1890, a husband was entitled to the income from such a property and could mortgage it without his wife's consent – unless her family had secured it to her through a trust. By May 1889 Frances Jones had mortgaged the property to a total of £5000, presumably to finance the erection of the building which Thomas Rees undertook during the year; FDG Stanley, former Queensland Colonial Architect, was the designer. Rees had also built the adjacent warehouse (South East Queensland Water Board Building) several years earlier.

The building was completed by early 1890 and in February Benjamin Brothers Ltd occupied the western section (Nos 49–51) – using it as a bulk store. The building was flooded in the March 1890 floods and a photo taken at the time shows a "To Let" sign advertising the eastern section. The leasing agent was the Queensland Trustees Executors Agency Co (QTEA), presumably acting for Frances Sophia Jones.

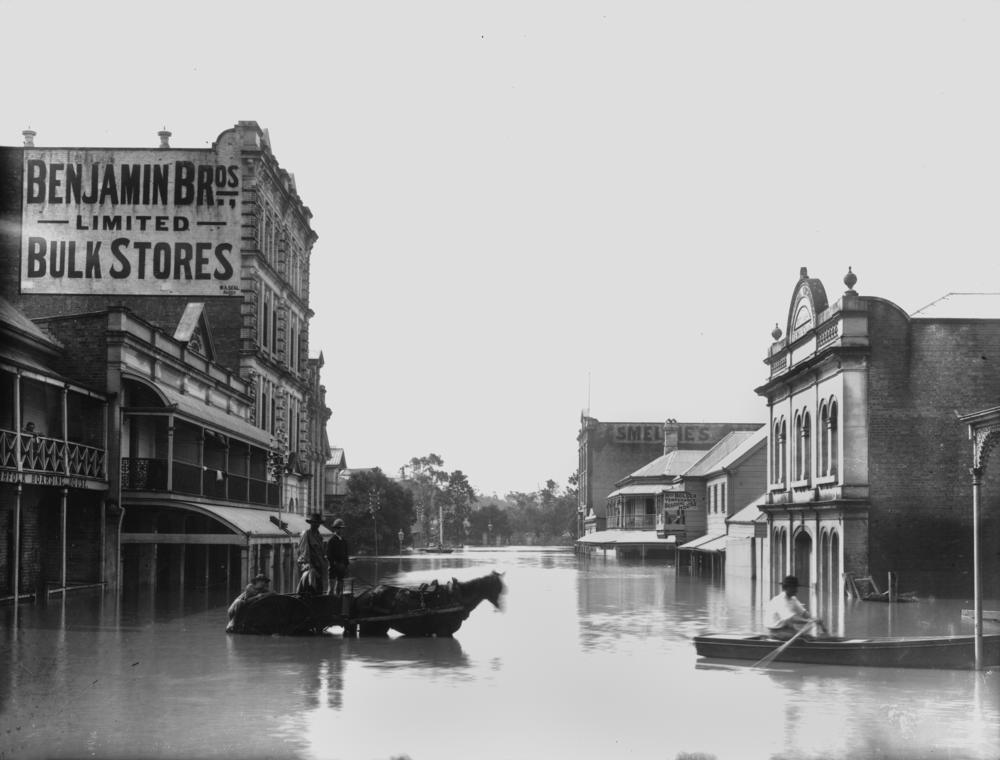
Benjamin Brothers bulk store during the 1893 flood

Two floods (1890 and 1893 Brisbane flood), low occupancy rates and a severely depressed economy no doubt contributed to the repossession of the building in 1894. In the same year, QTEA was struck off the companies register. The vacancy rates of the 1890s were relieved somewhat around the turn of the century with the first of a series of long-term tenancies. Leonard Spencer, coach builder and ironmonger, began a twenty-odd year occupancy of Nos 45–47 in 1903. Another enduring tenancy, that of Roche & Dahl leather merchants (Nos 49–51), began in 1911.

In 1913, ownership of the property was transferred to James Milne and James Raff of the machinery firm Smellie & Co, whose two business premises (Smellie's Building and Old Mineral House) were nearby. In the late 1920s or early 1930s, Leonard Spencer built his own building, Spencer Chambers, at 53 Edward Street and moved out of Nos 45–47. His place was taken by John Mitchell Hamilton, a tent manufacturer who eventually bought the entire building, with his son, in 1941. In the mid-1940s Jolly & Batchelor carried on the leather tradition at the building, buying out Roche & Dahl and moving into their premises. For many years, Jolly & Batchelor operated their business there; in 1964 they left the central city area for South Brisbane where they continue to provide materials and equipment to the leather trade and to the public. Another Spencer, a typewriter dealer, bought Nos 45–47 in 1978, but sold them to the present owners in 1987. The present owners of Nos 47–51 acquired the property in 1965.

By 2014, Nos 45–47 had been unoccupied for several years and were sold in September 2014 (needing refurbishment).

== Description ==
This Victorian warehouse has austere classical detailing in both rendered and unrendered brickwork. The building consists of four storeys and a basement level and is divided into two identical portions. The upper three floors of each portion are separated by a string course. The ground floor has tall arched openings surrounded by render that imitates rusticated stonework. Above each centre bay at the street level is a simple triangular classical pediment. The three upper levels are unrendered brick. Windows on these levels are separated by projecting brick pilasters. The windows on the two middle levels have arched heads and those on the upper level have curved pediments. Paired moulded brackets support the cornice line at the upper level. Above this the parapet has plain triangular pediments located over each central bay. The engaged brick piers at the sides and in the centre of the building continue the rusticated theme of the rendered base by having seven fielded plaster panels regularly distributed along the height of the pier on each level.

Both rendered and unrendered portions of the building have been altered with the use of aluminium shopfronting at street level, moving the entry into a side bay, and a cantilevered awning. Some of the other windows have also been modified with the use of aluminium-framed glazing. The face brickwork has been painted, eliminating the original distinction between the upper three levels and the rendered street-level facade. At the rear, the face brick remains unpainted, and the two portions are distinguished by separate gable ends with central loading gantries. A modern steel fire stair serves both sections of the building.

== Heritage listing ==
Spencers Building was listed on the Queensland Heritage Register on 27 August 1993, having satisfied the following criteria.

The place is important in demonstrating the evolution or pattern of Queensland's history.

Spencers Building is important in demonstrating the pattern of Queensland's history, in particular the pattern of warehouse development in this area of Brisbane during the late nineteenth century.

The place is important in demonstrating the principal characteristics of a particular class of cultural places.

With its classical styling, Spencers Building demonstrates some of the principal characteristics of a Victorian warehouse.

The place is important because of its aesthetic significance.

Spencers Building is important in exhibiting particular aesthetic characteristics valued by the community, including the unusual decorative treatment of the facade which differentiates this building from other late nineteenth-century warehouses and the visual cohesion of the warehouses including the adjoining South East Queensland Water Board Building, in height, scale and materials.
