= Trustees Chambers =

Heritage listed building in Brisbane, Queensland

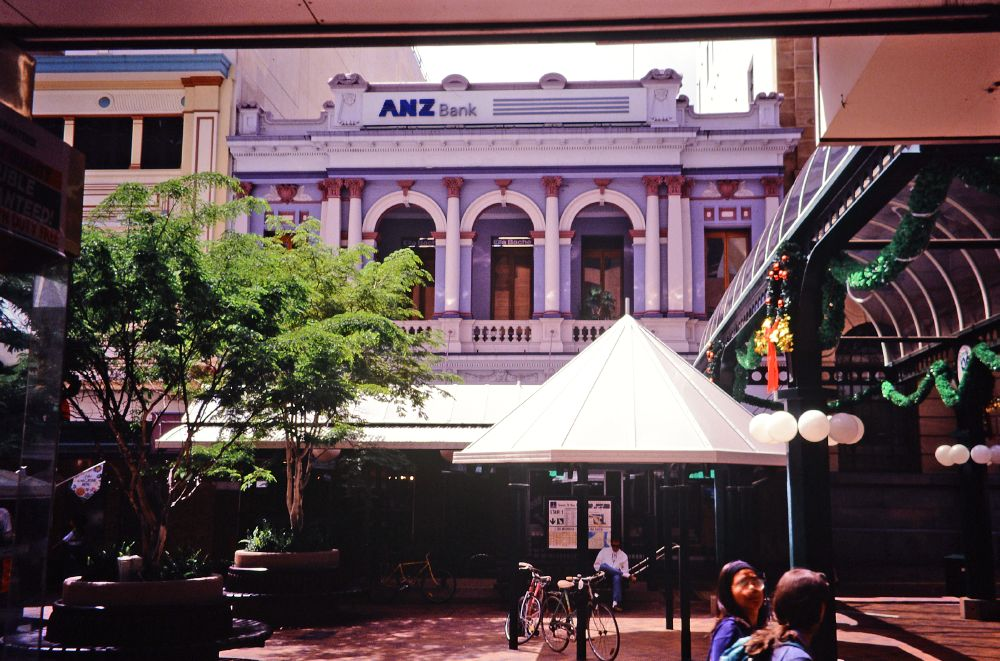
- Building as an ANZ Bank branch, 1991

- Location within Queensland
- 27.4709°S 153.0241°E
- Location: 43 Queen Street, Brisbane City, City of Brisbane, Queensland, Australia

History
- Design period: 1900–1914 (early 20th century)
- Built: c. 1900

Site notes
- Architect: Addison & Corrie
- Architectural style: Classicism

Queensland Heritage Register
- Official name: ANZ Bank, Trustees Chambers
- Type: state heritage (built)
- Designated: 21 October 1992
- Reference no.: 600157
- Significant period: c. 1900 (fabric)
- Builders: Walter Taylor

The Trustees Chambers is a heritage-listed commercial building located at 43 Queen Street, City of Brisbane, Queensland, Australia. It is currently used by the Australia and New Zealand Banking Group. It was designed by Addison & Corrie and built c. 1900 by Walter Taylor. It was also known as ANZ Bank. It was added to the Queensland Heritage Register on 21 October 1992.

== History ==
This building was constructed c. 1900. The site was purchased by the Bank of New South Wales in 1853. In 1866 the bank erected premises on the corner of Queen and George Streets across part of both allotments (later rebuilt as the Bank of New South Wales Building), and the remainder of the site became a garden associated with the bank residence.

In February 1899 the bank decided to construct a building on the remainder of the site and engaged architects Addison and Corrie to design a two storeyed commercial building. Walter Taylor was the contractor, and the building containing offices and shops was completed in late 1900 at a cost of £6,737.

The basement and ground floor were leased to Queensland Trustees Limited, while the upper floors was leased to several legal firms. Queensland Trustees moved to other premises in 1913, but the building remained known as Trustee Chambers.

Alterations to Trustees Chambers were made in late 1933. In November 1935 Trustees Chambers was sold to HA Manahan & Sons Proprietary Limited, chain store grocers. In 1957 the Prudential Assurance Company Limited purchased the building and leased it to the Australia and New Zealand Bank Ltd. In 1985 ANZ Properties (Australia) Limited became the registered proprietors.

In 2016, the building was available for lease.

== Description ==
Trustees Chambers is a two-storeyed brick building, with rendered decoration, located beside the Bank of New South Wales building at the southern end of the Myer Centre in Queen Street. The classical main facade, has an arcaded verandah at the first floor level. The verandah has three arched openings and at each end are square headed window openings. Square pilasters with florid capitals are situated to each side of these windows and at each end of the arcade which has matching engaged columns to each side of every arch. The originally unrendered brickwork on the first floor has been painted.

The shopfronts at street level are modern in materials and design.

At the rear the building takes on a domestic scale with separate hipped roofs, a chimney, and a timber verandah at first floor level which extends around to the original toilets, which are located in a narrow wing are the rear of the building.

Internally the building has some intact portions. In a front section of the basement the vaulted underside of the slab above supported on cast iron columns is clearly visible. This has three vaults supported on two rows of columns extending five bays back from the front of the building. A pair of double-hung sash windows exist at the side to the rear of the building behind the neighbouring Bank of New South Wales building.

== Heritage listing ==
Trustees Chambers was listed on the Queensland Heritage Register on 21 October 1992 having satisfied the following criteria.

The place is important in demonstrating the evolution or pattern of Queensland's history.

The place is important in demonstrating the principal characteristics of a particular class of cultural places.

The place is important because of its aesthetic significance.

The building demonstrates the principal characteristics of a late Victorian commercial building and is important in exhibiting aesthetic characteristics valued by the community, in particular, the arcaded first floor and the buildings' contribution to the streetscape of Queen Street as one of a group of surviving 19th and 20th century buildings and facades.
