= Langer =

Langer is a surname originally of German origin. For the etymology, meaning, and pronunciation of the name, and for the Hiberno-English slang word, see Wiktionary.

People with the family name Langer include:

== Academics and scientists ==
- Alois Langer, biomedical engineer
- Arthur M. Langer, professor of professional practice
- Bernard Langer (surgeon), surgeon
- Ellen Langer, professor of psychology
- James S. Langer, professor of physics
- Jerzy Langer, professor of physics
- Karl Langer, (1819–1887), professor of anatomy
  - Langer's lines, named for him
- Lawrence L. Langer, Holocaust scholar
- Lawrence M. Langer, professor of physics
- Robert S. Langer, chemical engineer
- Rudolf Ernest Langer, mathematician
  - the Langer correction, named for him
- Ruth Langer, professor of theology
- Salomon Z. Langer, pharmacologist
- Susanne Langer, professor of philosophy
- Walter C. Langer, psychoanalyst
- William L. Langer, historian

== Artists and entertainers ==
- A. J. Langer, American actress
- Clive Langer, British record producer
- Elena Langer, Russian-British composer
- Eli Langer, Canadian artist
- Gilda Langer, German actress
- Jason Langer, American photographer
- Mads Langer, Danish singer-songwriter
- Milan Langer, Czech pianist

== Politicians and activists ==
- Albert Langer, Australian political activist
  - Langer vote, named for him
- Alexander Langer, Italian journalist, peace activist, politician, translator, and teacher
- Ivan Langer, Czech politician
- Felicia Langer, Israeli advocate for Palestinian human rights
- Kris Langer, American politician from South Dakota
- Mimí Langer, Austrian activist
- William Langer, American politician from North Dakota
- William Langer (Assemblyman), American politician from Wisconsin

== Sportspeople ==
- Allan Langer, Australian rugby league footballer
- Anja Langer, German bodybuilder
- Bernhard Langer, German golfer
- Jack Langer (born 1948/1949), American basketball player and investment banker
- Jim Langer, American football player
- Justin Langer, Australian cricketer
- Lucyna Langer, Polish athlete
- Ludy Langer, American swimmer
- Lutz Langer, German Paralympic athlete
- Michael Langer, Austrian footballer
- Nils Langer, German tennis player
- Rob Langer, Australian cricketer
- Rudolf Langer, German athlete
- Ruth Langer (1921–1999), Austrian swimmer
- Scott Langer, American hockey coach
- Sylvia Langer (born 1954), German swimmer

== Writers ==
- Adam Langer, American author
- František Langer, Czech playwright
- "Franz Langer", a pen name for German author Karl May
- Jiří Langer, Czech poet

== Others ==
- Anton de Franckenpoint, nicknamed "Anton Langer", first person scientifically verified to have been over 8 feet tall
- Gertrude Langer, Austrian-Australian art critic
- Gwido Langer, Polish cryptologist
- Karl Langer (architect), Austrian-Australian architect
  - Langer House, named for him
- Karl-Heinz Langer, German Luftwaffe pilot
- Mayanti Langer, Indian TV presenter

== Fictional characters ==
- Karla-Heinrike Langer, a character from Strike Witches
- Clyde Langer, a main character from The Sarah Jane Adventures

== Locations ==
- Langer Bach, river in Germany
- Langer Eugen, office building in Germany
- Langer Heinrich Mine, uranium mine in Namibia
- Langer See, lake in Germany
