= St John's Lutheran Church, Bundaberg =

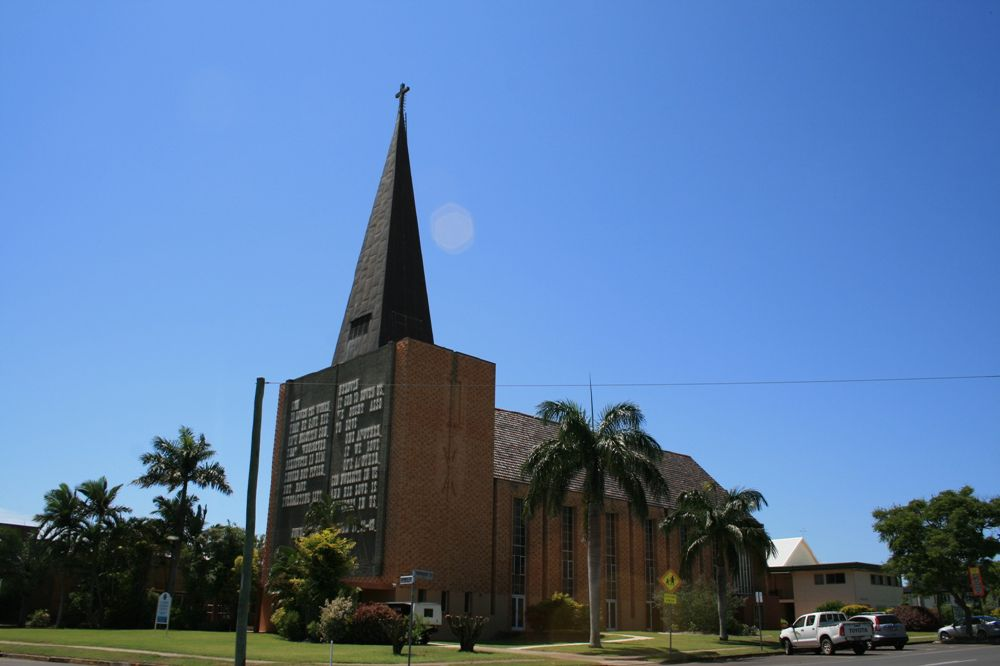
- St John's Lutheran Church, 2010

- Location within Queensland Location within Australia
- 24.8698°S 152.3617°E
- Location: 30 George Street, Bundaberg South, Bundaberg, Bundaberg Region, Queensland, Australia

History
- Design period: 1940s–1960s (post-World War II)
- Built: 1960

Site notes
- Architect: Karl Langer
- Architectural style: Modernism

Queensland Heritage Register
- Official name: St John's Lutheran Church, Bundaberg
- Type: state heritage (built)
- Designated: 7 December 2012
- Reference no.: 602815
- Significant period: 1960
- Significant components: church
- Builders: J Hutchinson and Sons

St John's Lutheran Church is a heritage-listed church at 30 George Street, Bundaberg South, Bundaberg, Bundaberg Region, Queensland, Australia. It was designed by Karl Langer and built in 1960 by J Hutchinson and Sons . It was added to the Queensland Heritage Register on 7 December 2012.

== History ==
St John's Lutheran Church, Bundaberg, built in 1960, was designed by architect Dr Karl Langer as the primary Lutheran church for the Bundaberg community. It is used regularly by the congregation and the adjacent Lutheran school.

The settlement of Bundaberg began on the northern banks of the Burnett River in 1867 but an official survey was undertaken in 1869 and the town was re-sited onto the higher, southern banks. The first land sale held in Bundaberg occurred on 22 August 1872, although two previous sales of Bundaberg land had taken place in Maryborough. The area developed as an agricultural and port town. Initially a number of the early settlers exploited the timber on their selections but as a result of the incentives of the Sugar and Coffee Regulations 1864, sugar became a major component in Bundaberg's development from the 1870s. German farmers settled in Woongarra Scrub, south-east of Bundaberg in 1871, bringing Lutheranism to the area.

Lutheranism is a major branch of Christianity and places a strong emphasis on the Bible. To Lutherans, the Bible is the only source of divine knowledge and the basis for their faith. In 1838 the first Lutherans arrived in Australia from Prussia and established communities in South Australia and Moreton Bay. That year a group of German Lutheran and Presbyterian missionaries established Zion Hill (at present day Nundah), a mission for Christianising aborigines, on the outskirts of Moreton Bay Penal Colony. It was not considered successful and was abandoned in 1848. In 1857 Lutheran Pastor Carl Franz Alexander Schirmeister came to Moreton Bay and established congregations at North Brisbane, South Brisbane, Ipswich and Toowoomba. He obtained government grants of land for church use and the first church was built in North Brisbane in 1861, followed quickly by churches at the other locations. Over the following decades Lutheranism was spread across Queensland. Around 1859 the newly formed colony of Queensland launched a vigorous immigration policy that continued for over 40 years. It attracted many Germans who formed distinct communities amidst the essentially-British nation. Although only a minority of these Germans were Lutheran, across the state Lutheran congregations grew.

Lutheranism in Bundaberg was established in 1873. Lutheran Pastor Carl Hellmuth of Maryborough visited Bundaberg to preach, administer Holy Communion, and baptise - the first formal Lutheran services in Bundaberg. In 1877 monthly services commenced in a shop in Bundaberg and in 1882 Bundaberg's first Lutheran church was built in Tanitha Street. This was the first St John's church and was a simple timber building. It was inundated by flood waters several times so higher land was purchased in 1890 at the corner of George and Boundary Streets and the second timber St John's church was built here in 1892.

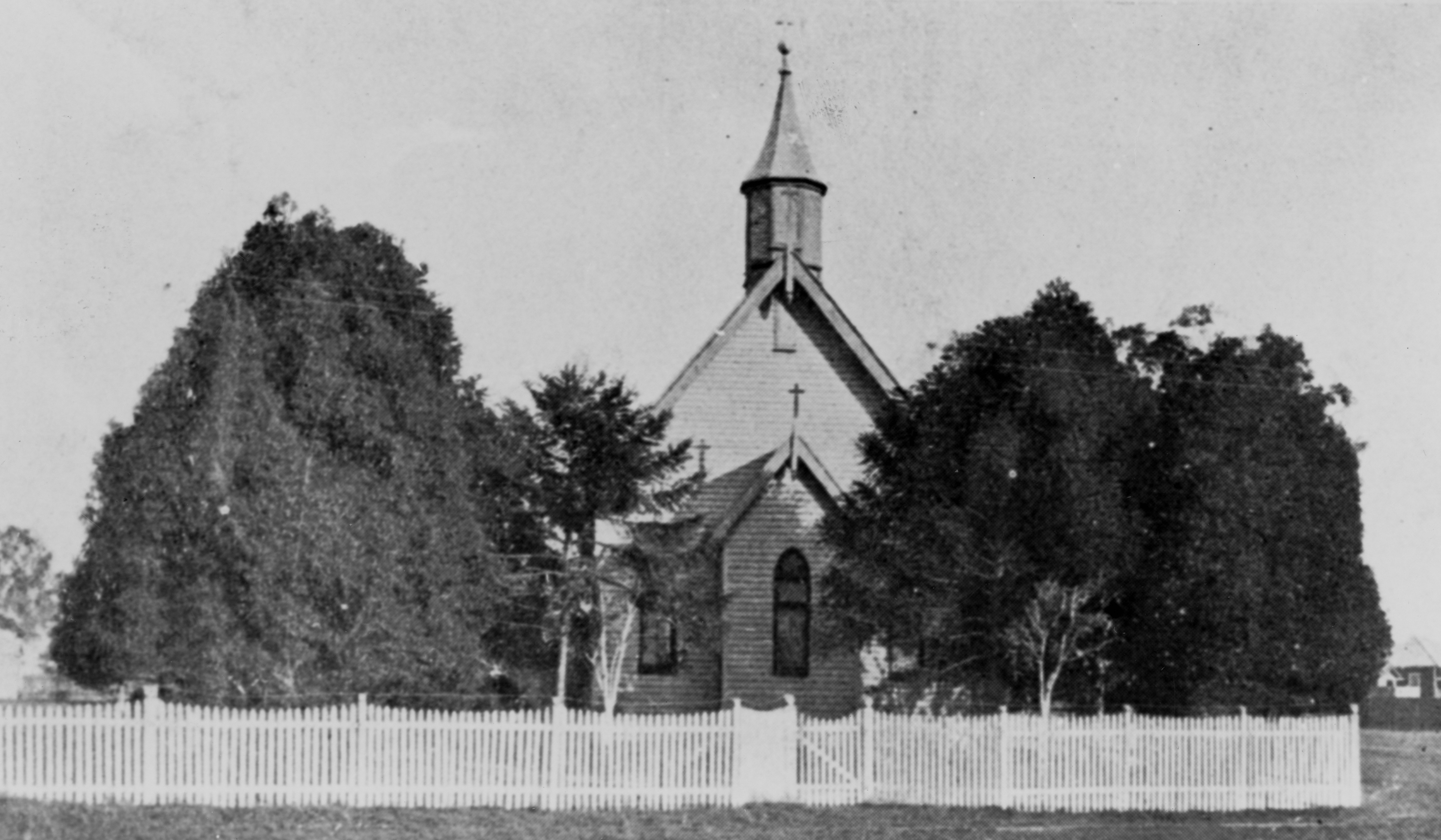
The second St John's Church, built 1892

Bundaberg overtook Maryborough as the regional centre of the Wide Bay-Burnett during the interwar period and growth continued post-World War II (WWII) with the city council promoting major revitalisation of the city. Many large building programs were completed including new hospitals, schools, court house, customs house, civic centre, and port, transforming Bundaberg. The population of the town rose from 18,000 in 1952 to 27,000 in 1967.

The 1950s and 1960s was an era of religious vitality in Australia. During this period the nation was in a sustained economic boom, was led by conservative governments, and was experiencing high population growth. The congregations of major religions expanded and church attendance and religious society membership rose with accompanying financial improvement. Suburban churches regularly reported record congregation attendances on major holy days. Membership of the Lutheran church increased after WWII with the major influx of European migrants. In the early to mid-1960s a number of Christian religions made alterations to the way they ministered to their congregation in order to re-establish themselves within the modern world. With increased incomes, increased congregations, and an increasingly modern approach, considerable building programs were undertaken. Spacious brick churches were built in a modern style, often replacing smaller timber churches.

In June 1940 the serving minister of St John's Lutheran Church, Pastor M Reuther, received an anonymous letter from "a Progressive Lutheran" (who was later revealed to be his wife) which included a donation of £1 toward a new and larger brick church. In 1947 Emilie Lovgren bequeathed £6,000 for the constructing a tower or steeple of a new church. In the following nine years pledges from church members brought the total available for construction to £32,000. In 1955 Brisbane-based architect and town planner Karl Langer was engaged as architect for the new church.

Langer (1903–1969) was born on 28 July 1903 in Vienna, Austria. He studied at the Vienna Academy of Fine Arts under the directorship of German Modernist designer Peter Behrens and in 1928, the year of his graduation, Langer was employed by Behrens to run his office in Vienna. In 1933 Langer was awarded a Doctor of Philosophy for his thesis entitled "Origins and Development of Concrete Construction".

Langer immigrated to Australia with his wife, Dr Gertrude Langer, in 1939 bringing direct experience of the European Modern Movement to Queensland. He gained temporary employment with architects Cook and Kerrison in Brisbane and from 1940 lectured part-time in architecture and architectural design at the University of Queensland, publishing Sub-Tropical Housing in 1944. This booklet explored issues related to house design and town planning in a sub-tropical climate and influenced many architects working in the post-WWII era.

In 1944 Langer was employed as an assistant town planner in the Brisbane City Council. From 1945, he was commissioned to work on a range of town planning projects for Darwin, Ingham, Toowoomba, Yeppoon, Kingaroy, Mount Isa, Mackay and for the National Capital Development Commission in Canberra. Concurrently, he completed numerous architectural projects of a wide variety including small, economical domestic work and large commercial and institutional work.

As an architect and town planner, Langer had a pronounced impact upon the built environment of Australia, especially in Queensland, from the 1940s until his death in 1969. Along with numerous cultural pursuits, Langer was active in the Royal Australian Institute of Architects; first president (1952) of the Queensland division of the Royal Australian Planning Institute; a founder and chairman (1966–68) of the Queensland Association of Landscape Architects; and a member (1963–69) of the National Trust of Queensland. Important examples of his architectural work include the Langer residence at St Lucia (1950); Mackay Sugar Research Station (1953); Kingaroy Town Hall and Civic Square (1963); Assembly Hall at Ipswich Girls' Grammar School (1964); Main Roads Building, Spring Hill (1966); Lennon's Hotel, Broadbeach (1957) (demolished); and Lennon's Hotel, Toowoomba. His body of work is a clearly distinguishable exploration of a sub-tropical Modernism culminating in the Chapel of St Peter's Lutheran College, Indooroopilly, his last built work.

Modernism developed in pre-World War I (WWI) Europe and gained popularity in Australia post-WWII. It was more than a design style and is notable for a rationalising of planning emphasising clarity and simplicity of form and detailing. American and Scandinavian influences were strong in Australia. During the 1950s and 1960s a similar rationalisation occurred within Christian religions in an effort to modernise approaches to religious practice. Churches became brighter and simpler in form and decorative treatments. They used new materials and forms while incorporating many traditional elements and symbols. Design responses included variations on the medieval church with simple massing, a rectangular nave stripped of apses, aisles and chapels, a dramatically lit sanctuary rear wall and simple belltower.

Influenced by the architecture of Ancient Greece and the Modernist ideas of contemporary European architecture, Langer developed a sophisticated hybrid of ancient and modern principles of design bridging modern and traditional architecture. Typically, Langer explored the idea of the conjunction of landscape and landmark and his designs often involve a designed landscape incorporating the building. At St John's, Langer proposed a building with a simplified traditional form consisting of a box-like church with a very tall spire set back from the street by a plaza with reflecting pool, palms and colonnade. The plaza elements were not constructed. Langer designed the front of the church to appear as an open bible with bible passages in large letters, legible from a distance. This represented the authority of scripture within the faith. Further, side walls of the tower featured large Christian motifs in raised brickwork.

Langer's exploration of Modernism was heavily influenced by context. He studied the local fauna and flora in Queensland and the climate. His work interprets this information in a Modernist manner. He typically exploited passive lighting and ventilation in uncomplicated ways; at St John's his design includes simple methods of passive ventilation and a naturally lit interior.

Langer had developed a connection with the Lutheran community of Queensland by 1960 and went on to strengthen the connection through his repeated work for the church. This work includes St John's Lutheran Church, Ipswich (1961) and at St Peter's College, Indooroopilly a chaplain's residence (1954), dormitory block (1954–55), dining hall block (1966), concrete footbridge (1966–67), science block (1967–68), entrance fence and gates (1968), and chapel (1968).

Tenders for the construction of the new St John's Lutheran Church, Bundaberg were called in 1957 and a tender of £35,140 from Brisbane-based J Hutchinson and Sons was accepted. A ground-breaking ceremony took place 19 January 1958. A large portion of the work was carried out by volunteer church members including digging the foundations by hand, carting bricks, tiles, sand, and gravel, mixing and pouring concrete, and donating and milling timber. Construction was completed in 1960 with the total cost at £61,000 including the organ, pews, and all furnishings. A dedication service, led by the Queensland District President FH Schmidt, was witnessed by 1400 worshippers on 3 April 1960.

A 4.5-metre-long (15 ft) timber crucifix was commissioned for the wall above the altar. Made in Queensland of Queensland silky oak, the cross holds a 2.4-metre-long (7.9 ft) figure of Christ carved from Tasmanian King William pine, the work of Alfred Schubert, a Czech-born woodcarver from Melbourne who had trained in Bavaria.

A number of items and fixtures were kept from the earlier church and installed in the new church including: panels of stained and painted glass inset into the new windows; the baptismal font donated to the church in 1883; the pipe organ originally installed in 1899 and largely rebuilt in 1938 incorporating the old pipes and bellows; the church bell cast in Maryborough in 1892; a leather-bound German bible with silver clasps presented by the Empress Augusta Victoria of Germany to St John's Lutheran Church Bundaberg in 1911; and various other religious paraphernalia.

The old timber church was moved prior to 1960 to join the old Sunday School hall behind the new church. Both were extensively remodelled to become a kitchen and supper room and a hall. The understorey was enclosed to form ten classrooms by 31 January 1960. As a centenary project in 1977 it was decided to establish a Christian Day School on the site and the hall was extended to accommodate two more classrooms. Eventually, the school, now St John's Lutheran Primary School, grew to cover almost the entire block adjacent to the church and to occupy many buildings.

Little alteration to the church has occurred over time. Around 2009, the sanctuary plinth was extended into the nave to form a larger sanctuary area. Externally, the projecting bricks on all elevations were sheared flat from ground level up to the level of the lintel of ground floor windows and these areas were rendered and painted. The pulpit had its original timber canopy removed and stored in the choir loft.

The site of St John's Lutheran Church has been the focus for worship within the Lutheran community of Bundaberg since the construction of the first St John's Lutheran Church in 1892. The adjacent St John's Lutheran Primary School has grown into a large school from its establishment in the church hall in 1977 and the school uses the church regularly. The church is prominent within the low-scale surrounding development and remains a landmark within the area. It has featured in Bundaberg City Council promotional material, praising its architectural and artistic merits. The church has been in continuous use since construction and has seen baptisms, marriages, funeral services and regular worship services for generations of Lutherans.

== Description ==
St John's Lutheran Church, Bundaberg, stands prominently on a corner site in a quiet, residential area of Bundaberg. The church stands at the centre of the site bounded by George Street to the north, Boundary Street to the west, Bell Street to the south and St John's Lutheran Primary School to the east.

The church is rectangular in plan, 41 metres (135 ft) long and 17 metres (56 ft) wide, with the entrance front facing north. It is set back from George Street fronted a small, grassed forecourt with palms and shrubs. The building has a box-like body sheltered by a large, gable tiled roof. A tall, slender, square-based spire sheeted with copper rises to almost 44 metres (144 ft) above the ground. The copper cross atop extends a further 2.7 metres (8 ft 10 in) and is lit by fluorescent tubes. The northern and southern sides of the spire have fixed copper louvres at the level of the hanging bell.

The external walls are orange face brick laid in English bond with projecting headers creating a repetitive pattern and texture-the lower part of the walls are without projecting bricks and are painted. Projecting bricks form large Christograms on the side walls of the tower - "ihs" on the east and "xp" on the west. The east and west walls of the body of the church are divided into six bays by full height recesses containing copper rainwater downpipes with detailed copper heads and straps. The bays each have a fixed, steel framed glazing to full height above a double-leaf, glazed, timber framed door. An architrave of projecting headers defines the openings. Beyond the southernmost bay the chancel is lit by fixed, steel framed glazing with deep reveals. The vestries project beneath these windows. The rear wall is windowless and has a field of projecting headers with a large central cross formed by projecting bricks. The vestry walls do not have projecting bricks and are rendered and painted.

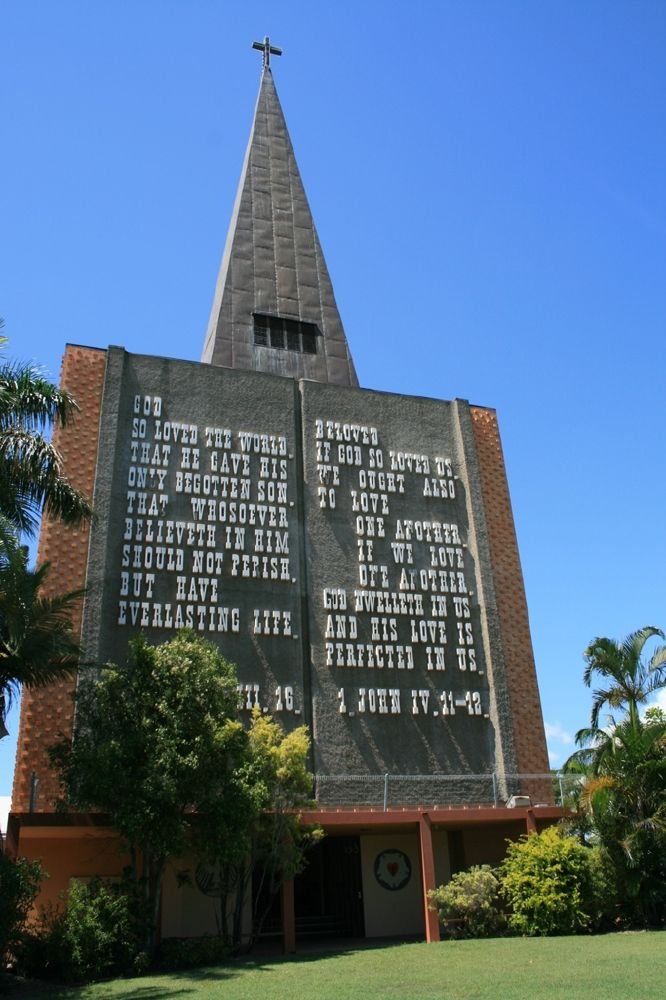
Open bible above the portico, 2010

The church entrance is a simple, open, painted concrete portico. Above the portico the north elevation of the tower is treated to suggest an open bible with raised, white cement rendered letters two feet high on dark grey textured concrete pages reading:

GOD SO LOVED THE WORLD, THAT HE GAVE HIS ONLY BEGOTTEN SON, THAT WHOSOEVER BELIEVETH IN HIM SHOULD NOT PERISH, BUT HAVE EVERLASTING LIFE. JOHN III. 16

and

BELOVED IF GOD SO LOVED US, WE OUGHT ALSO TO LOVE ONE ANOTHER, IF WE LOVE ONE ANOTHER. GOD DWELLETH IN US AND HIS LOVE IS PERFECTED IN US. 1. JOHN IV, 11–12

The portico floor is unpainted concrete and on the painted and rendered portico walls are two circular panels of mosaics approximately 1 metre (3 ft 3 in) in diameter. One depicts St John's eagle and the other Luther's Seal. Two sandstone plaques are fixed to the wall, which read:

IN MEMORY OF EMILIE LOVGREEN WHOSE GENEROUS GIFT MADE THIS TOWER POSSIBLE. "THANKS BE TO GOD."

and

THIS STONE WAS LAID ON 24TH MAY 1958 BY PASTOR F.H. SCHMIDT, PRESIDENT, U.E.L.C.A. QLD. DIST. "UNTO GOD BE GLORY IN THE CHURCH BY CHRIST JESUS THROUGHOUT ALL AGES, WORLD WITHOUT END. AMEN" EPH. 3, 21.

The portico opens into an entry vestibule through large, bi-folding, steel gates embellished with the notation "1960". The vestibule has a low ceiling of stained and varnished timber battens and a floor of grey vinyl tiles with contrasting white tiles in a cross shape in two places. Within the vestibule are three steps up onto the level of the nave.

From the vestibule there is an office to the left and a rest room area to the right. The rest room area accommodates a toilet, cleaner's room, and a crying room (a room to retreat to with children during the service) which has double-glazed fixed window into the nave and acoustic sheeting to one wall. The office and the rest room contain built-in benches, cupboards, tables, chairs and fittings such as wall-hung speakers which are original elements.

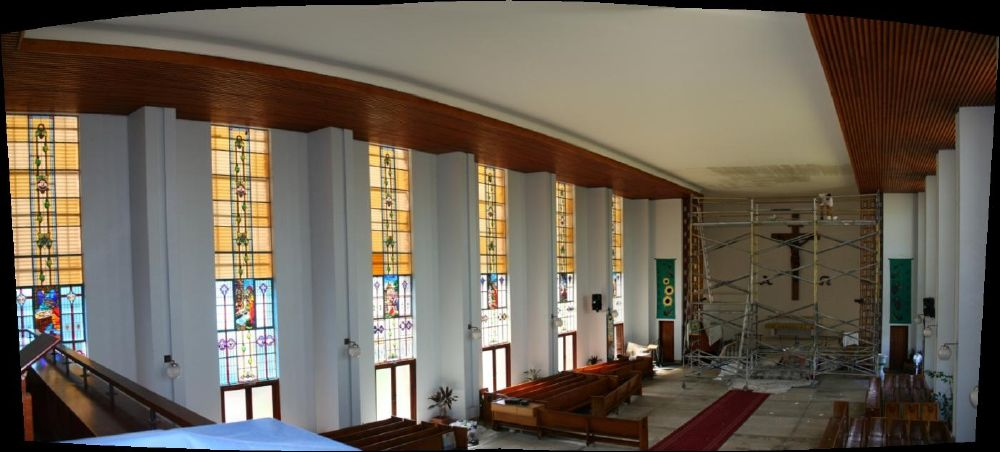
Church interior, 2010

The vestibule opens to the nave through large, timber-framed glass sliding doors. The body of the church is a large space, brightly lit and uncluttered. The walls and flat ceiling are painted white complementing the stained and varnished timber elements. The floor is plain concrete squares with a red and gold carpet running the length and width of the aisle. The pews are silky oak, carved with a version of Durer's "Praying Hands" at the aisle end; some have memorial plaques, e.g. Donated by Mr and Mrs A.T. Thompson in memory of Mr and Mrs Hermann Rehbein. The perimeter of the ceiling features a wide band of timber battens emphasising the length of the nave and drawing the eye to the sanctuary. Twelve large windows light the nave. They contain panels depicting scenes from the Gospel of St John in stained and painted glass including portions of older glass from the earlier church, some feature dedications, e.g., In Memory of Mr and Mrs H. Pressler from their children within the glass and on plaques. The nave is electrically lit by wall sconces with glass shades and by fluorescent lights recessed between the ceiling battens. A cast plaster baptismal font (from the earlier church) with painted leaves and inscription stands to the west side of the sanctuary.

The sanctuary is framed by decorative timber battened screens to the height of the nave, a timber battened pulpit stands to the left and a timber battened lectern on the right. The sanctuary has a red and gold carpet and three steps lead to the altar area which has a low altar rail of timber and steel. The concrete altar cantilevers from the rear wall and is decorated by red, gold, yellow, black, and white mosaic tiles with borders, crosses and the word HALLELUJAH picked out in tiles. A plaque fixed to the altar reads, Donated by The Children of MR AND MRS. J.A. ZUNKER In Honour of their Parents.

Fixed to the wall above the altar is a large, stained and varnished timber crucifix flanked by timber Greek letters alpha and omega.

On the east side of the sanctuary is the main vestry and on the west is the server's vestry. The rooms also contain timber tables and chairs that appear older than 1960.

The choir loft over the vestibule is supported by twin, canted, timber columns and is accessed via a small stair on the east side. The loft is open to the nave and has a tiered, timber floor. Timber battens line the rear wall which angles into the ceiling forming a shell-like space for the projection of sound into the nave. A fixed organ console stands near the front and its screened pipes are located at the rear of the loft. The loft contains timber pews and chairs.

The church has a variety of movable paraphernalia including candlesticks, framed portrait photographs, timber flower stands, timber crucifixes and crosses, lecterns, tables, bookcases, carved timber panels with leadlight, a scale model of the preceding St John's church of 1892, a framed, inscribed marble plaque, a wardrobe, cabinets, fabric hangings and books. Some of these were commissioned as part of the church construction or are from earlier churches.

The gardens consist of grass areas and shrubbery with some established palms. Unpainted concrete paths and stairs surround the base of the church.

A large timber hall stands to the south of the church and is not considered to be of cultural heritage significance.

== Heritage listing ==
St John's Lutheran Church, Bundaberg was listed on the Queensland Heritage Register on 7 December 2012 having satisfied the following criteria.

The place is important in demonstrating the evolution or pattern of Queensland's history.

St John's Lutheran Church, Bundaberg, constructed in 1960 on the site of a previous Lutheran church built in 1892, is important in demonstrating the pattern of settlement in Queensland, particularly, the closer, agricultural settlement in the Bundaberg area by immigrant Lutherans from the 1870s.

As a highly intact Modernist church, it is important in representing Modernist ecclesiastical architecture in Queensland during a period of significant re-evaluation and modernisation of Christian religions worldwide. Designed to be a literal expression of the Word of God, it expresses the essence of the theology underpinning Lutheranism.

The place is important in demonstrating the principal characteristics of a particular class of cultural places.

The place is important in demonstrating the principal characteristics and qualities of a Modernist church in Queensland. Highly intact, the building is a simple arrangement of forms and spaces using a restrained palette of fine quality materials and finishes. The church is notable for including a dominant bell tower, a large, well-lit nave focussed on an impressive sanctuary, a choir loft, a crying room, and a vestry.

The place is a fine example of the work of architect, Dr Karl Langer, featuring characteristic simplified forms and spatial arrangements, incorporation of natural light and ventilation and employing a restrained use of good quality materials.

The place is important because of its aesthetic significance.

Notable for its high quality of design, materials and construction, the place is important for its aesthetic significance. Featuring a prominent spire supported by monumental representations of biblical verses and Christograms, its symbolic features and landmark qualities have a strong dramatic effect in the landscape. The sculptural qualities of the high volume, austere interior evoke feelings of awe and reverence affected through the use of white plaster finishes complementing fine timber screens and panels; long coloured glass windows flooding the nave with light; and finely crafted timber furniture, including sculptural elements like the praying hands carved to the end of each pew.
