= Main Roads Building =

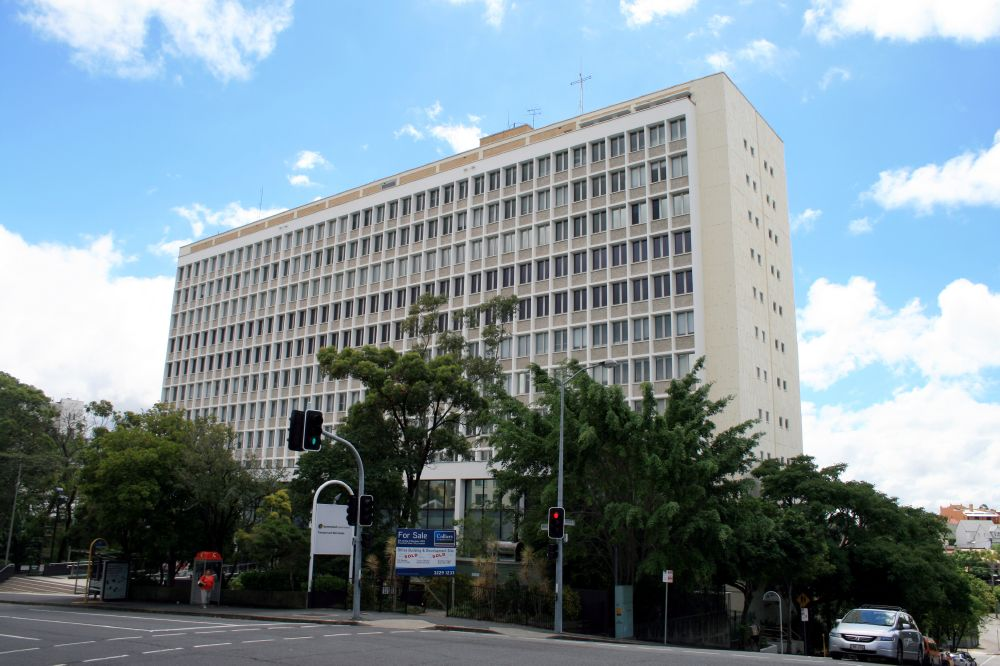
- Main Roads Building, 2014

- Location within Queensland Location within Australia
- 27.4601°S 153.023°E
- Location: 477 Boundary Street, Spring Hill, City of Brisbane, Queensland, Australia

History
- Design period: 1940s–1960s (post-World War II)
- Built: 1967
- Built for: Queensland Government

Site notes
- Architect: Karl Langer
- Architectural style: Modernism

Queensland Heritage Register
- Official name: Department of Main Roads Building (former)
- Type: state heritage
- Designated: 13 June 2014
- Reference no.: 602830
- Builders: Cyril Porter Hornick

The Main Roads Building is a heritage-listed office building at 477 Boundary Street, Spring Hill, City of Brisbane, Queensland, Australia. It was designed by Karl Langer and built in 1967 by Cyril Porter Hornick. It was added to the Queensland Heritage Register on 13 June 2014.

== History ==
The former Main Roads Department Building was built in 1967 to accommodate, consolidate, and modernise the department during a period of extensive expansion and upgrade of Queensland's road network. It housed the department until 2012. Designed by important Modernist architect, Dr Karl Langer, the substantial office building is an excellent, intact illustration of his commercial work and is a good representative example of a mid-twentieth century highrise.

In the early 1960s the Main Roads Department (MRD) faced a major task in modernising Queensland's road network. Prior to this, the department saw itself only as a rural roads authority responsible for the provision and maintenance of main roads connecting Queensland settlements. The decentralised nature of Queensland, with its scattered population and small tax base for local governments, was not conducive to systematic road building, and until the mid-twentieth century railways dominated long-distance transport. Although the Queensland Government was responsible for main roads and roads on Crown Lands open for selection, elsewhere local authorities had to finance their own roads; or where there were no local authorities, local landholders could form road trusts and receive government grants. Queensland's road system developed in a piecemeal fashion until 1920 and even after it remained a secondary government spending priority to railways, which spread rapidly in the early twentieth century to service agricultural areas.

Although railways were the priority, the rise of the motor car increased the need for an expanded and improved road network. The Queensland Main Roads Act 1920 provided for responsibility for roads and bridges to be shared between state and local authorities. The mission of the Main Roads Board, formed by this Act, was to develop a cohesive network of "main roads" partly funded by the state. Local authorities would fund half the cost, and would be the construction and maintenance authorities where possible. The priority for road construction was to join towns not linked by railways; to link farming areas to existing railways; and to build developmental roads to open Crown Lands for closer settlement.

The interwar period saw a massive increase in car registrations and the revision of the Main Roads Act. By mid-1923 nearly 17,000 cars were registered in Queensland (rising to nearly 92,000 by 1934). As more people took to the car, the need for serviceable roads for motor vehicles became apparent. The Main Roads Acts Amendment Act 1925 abolished the Main Roads Board and formed the Main Roads Commission (MRC), and the board was replaced by John Robert Kemp (formerly the Board's Chairman) as the Commissioner.

World War II (WWII) also stimulated road building efforts. During the war the MRC carried out a wide range of defence works, mostly for, and under the direction of, the Allied Works Council (AWC). Although the MRC increased its equipment during the war years, after WWII it faced resource shortages and a continued rise in car ownership, plus demands to seal more of the state's roads with bitumen.

After WWII, roads increasingly competed directly with railways. Vehicle numbers rose from 129,126 in 1945 to over 282,594 by 1954. By 1960, Australia was second only to the United States in terms of car ownership per head of population. In 1951, the MRC became the MRD. The MRD was responsible for the planning, survey and construction of state highways and of main, developmental, secondary, mining access, farmers' roads, and tourist roads and tracks, as well as bridges and related works. The department was under an increasing work load, brought about by the "explosion" in vehicle ownership and Queensland's buoyant economic expansion.

The MRD's Annual Report of 1955 noted that "Queensland is passing out of the earlier phase of road construction ... just sufficient to keep traffic moving. The State has entered a second phase where construction must provide for the traffic of to-day and the traffic of to-morrow in such a way that roads and bridges will carry in safety bigger volumes of traffic, comprising vehicles which move much faster and carry much more heavier loads...".

The push for a new head office for the MRD started around 1955. In December that year the Main Roads Commissioner, AR Williams, wrote to the Minister for Transport, Jack Duggan, advising that at no stage the MRD ever had a building designed and constructed for them. Williams stated that the MRD did not have close contact with the public, apart from registration, and "Motor vehicle registration activities require that the location be ... away from the heavily trafficked streets". Other requirements included garaging for departmental vehicles and a full size basement for record storage.

Prior to the construction of their new building at Spring Hill, the MRD was accommodated in buildings "scattered throughout the city". The intention of the new building was to provide better working facilities and amenities for an increasing staff in an efficient and productive environment. The department was performing a major role with private industry and commerce in Queensland's development and the new building would reflect this. Not only would it be an impressive place for people to register their vehicles, it would be the co-ordinating centre for the planning, survey, design and construction work of the MRD.

The Queensland Government acquired 16 allotments, totalling almost one hectare, at the corner of Boundary and Fortescue Streets, Spring Hill, between 1959 and 1961. At the time this area comprised primarily older detached housing.

In June 1959 Leo John Michael Feenaghty, Secretary of the MRD, wrote to Brisbane-based, private architect and town planner Dr Karl Langer, confirming that the government had decided to retain him as the architect for the new head office building. Langer's earliest designs for the MRD's "New Head Office Building" date to late 1959 with at least eight further iterations between 1959 and 1963. Early designs were discussed with the Acting Government Architect, Edward James Archibald Weller, at the Department of Public Works Architectural Branch in September 1959. Although generally satisfied, Weller was concerned that the building would "include some features that will set a precedent and to that extent will have an effect upon provision in Government Buildings generally".

Born in Vienna in 1903, Langer had studied at the Vienna Academy of Fine Arts and in 1928 he was employed by pioneer German Modernist designer Peter Behrens to run his Vienna office. In 1933 Langer was awarded a Doctor of Philosophy for his thesis "Origins and Development of Concrete Construction". In 1939 Langer immigrated to Australia with his wife, (Dr) Gertrude Langer, bringing direct experience of the European Modern Movement to Queensland. He gained temporary employment with architects Cook and Kerrison in Brisbane and from 1940 Langer lectured part-time in architecture and architectural design at The University of Queensland, publishing Sub-Tropical Housing in 1944. This booklet explored issues related to modern house design and town planning in a sub-tropical climate and influenced many Australian architects working in the post-WWII era.

Modernist architecture developed in pre-World War I Europe and gained popularity in Australia post-WWII. It is notable for a rationalisation of planning, emphasising clarity and simplicity of form and detailing. American and Scandinavian influences were strong in the style's employment in Australia.

From 1945 Langer was employed as an assistant town planner in the Brisbane City Council and also was commissioned to work on a range of town planning projects for Darwin, Ingham, Toowoomba, Yeppoon, Kingaroy, Mount Isa, and Mackay, and for the National Capital Development Commission, Canberra. Concurrently, he completed a wide variety of architectural projects including small, economical domestic work and large commercial and institutional work.

Influenced by classical Greek and contemporary Modernist architecture, Langer developed a sophisticated hybrid of classical and modern design principles. With his civic designs, Langer explored the idea of the conjunction of landmark and landscape and his designs typically incorporated a harmonious setting for the architecture. Inspired by Queensland's flora, fauna and climate, his designs worked with the context in complementary ways and his work on climatic design in architecture has been called "pioneering". Fundamental to his designs, he sited buildings and outdoor spaces for optimum orientation, ensured interiors had high levels of natural daylighting and ventilation, and incorporated gardens of Australian plants for the occupation and enjoyment of the users. His designs were typified by modern, highly functional spaces that were fit for purpose, yet, had a degree of flexibility of use. Langer set new standards for design in Queensland.

The work of the MRD was a major influence on the shaping and development of Queensland settlements, especially Brisbane, and also on the increasing prosperity of the state during the second half of the twentieth century. In January 1960 (Sir) Charles Barton was appointed Commissioner of Main Roads. Barton made a major push to modernise the existing road network into an extensive metropolitan highway and intercity freeway network and to improve the efficiency and responsiveness of the department. Based on studies by leading transport specialists following American precedents, the department drafted and implemented long-term programs of road upgrades and freeway construction. These programs expanded and the department grew to become a primary division of the Queensland Government with considerable authority.

On 1 July 1963 the first Road Plan of Queensland, a 20-year plan to build and upgrade roads to ensure no town was too far from a declared main road, encouraging social and economic development of rural areas, came into effect. The plan was visionary and required a well-organised and highly functional department.

Further road planning was facilitated by Queensland Government transport studies for major centres in the 1960s and early 1970s. The Brisbane Transportation Study, jointly commissioned in 1964 by the MRD and the Brisbane City Council, and undertaken by American transport planners Wilbur Smith and Associates, recommended a series of freeways, expressways and bridges, although only some of these were built. Under Barton, the MRD was also reshaped. Through operational and attitudinal changes he introduced a "private sector" business mode to achieve efficiency. He also increased decentralisation, appointing an Assistant Commissioner and Divisional Engineer each at Townsville, Rockhampton and Brisbane, and a Divisional Engineer at Toowoomba.

Site preparation for the new MRD head office at Spring Hill began on 15 July 1963. Approximately 15,300 cubic metres of earth was excavated and a reinforced concrete retaining wall up to nine metres high was built around three sides of the excavation to create a level platform on the sloping site. The government decided that Brisbane architect Colin Tesch would be responsible for construction documentation and administration of the contract. In June 1964 Queensland's State Government Insurance Office (SGIO) agreed to purchase the land from the MRD, pay for construction, and then lease the building back to the MRD for a 40-year term.

CP Hornick & Son Pty Ltd, the largest privately owned construction company in Queensland at the time, constructed the building. To deal with the MRD's ongoing accommodation shortage during construction of its new head office, a nearby partially erected building on Dickens Street was purchased and completed to MRD requirements, for occupation in late 1965.

Construction of the new head office commenced in July 1965. By this time the number of vehicles registered in Queensland had risen from 363,878 in 1958, to 541,198 in 1965. To deal with this rise in vehicle registrations, the counter section of the new head office was designed to have ten times more public space than the old Albert Street office.

Langer's design for the MRD building, the largest of his career, expressed his architectural principles. He described it as being a "sculptural" landmark. Others described at the time as vast and imposing. Yet, he employed techniques so that it would "fit" within its context, including stepping the building back from its boundaries so that it would not cast shadow onto the adjacent allotments and not overwhelm them with its scale, an extensive landscaping treatment around the building, and a 'delightful' screen of custom-designed breeze blocks facing Wedd Street to conceal the basement car park.

The building included an expansive public forecourt on Boundary Street, a typical characteristic of Langer's work. Approximately 21 metres (69 ft) wide by 72 metres (236 ft) long, it included lawns, gardens with Australian plants, and a large pond with fountain jets to cool the surrounding air. Langer envisioned the forecourt as an important public space for visitors to Spring Hill and to the building.

A recurrent inclusion in Langer's works, the building featured a modern allusion to a classical, grand colonnade at the primary entrance. Across the width of the ground floor and encompassing the ground and first floors, the rhythmic verticals and lintel of the concrete structural frame was expressed, smooth finished and painted white, contrasting with the dark glazing adjacent.

The building's structure and materials were modern, rational, and "honest", consistent with Langer's principles. The structure comprised a grid of concrete columns supporting concrete floor slabs, freeing the floor plan from loadbearing partitions, which maximised the flexibility of interior layouts. The vertical circulation, toilets and shower rooms, tea rooms, and other shared facilities were grouped in a central core. In this way, the floor plan was sensible and efficient and was repeated up the building. Principal materials were self-finishing, expressing their inherent character and beauty, with a noticeable use of Queensland-sourced materials for a "natural", decorative effect. Where practical, Langer eliminated suspended ceilings from the design.

Langer typically exploited passive lighting and ventilation in intelligent and uncomplicated ways and for the MRD building he included simple methods to achieve this. Parallel to the street, the long, narrow plan form (approximately 71 by 16 metres (233 by 52 ft)) was oriented with its long sides facing north-east and south-west. These elevations were highly glazed, comprising a grid of large, double-glazed, operable windows. A critical requirement for the drafting work of the department, this created interiors that were naturally well lit and well insulated, and allowed passive ventilation. The glazing was sheltered by a projecting "egg-crate" of concrete. The northern side had a deeper projection to block direct sun, reducing heat gain and glare. The west and east elevations were predominantly windowless to occlude the harsh, low sun and were built of concrete to provide a thermal mass quality. In contrast, the photographic and computational spaces that required highly controlled light and ventilation conditions were located in the basement levels, which had deep floor plans and limited fenestration.

An upturn in the city's economy and a modernising of the building codes that included a removal of building height limits in 1964 saw a considerable increase in the construction of highrise office buildings in Brisbane. Between 1950 and 1965 few office highrise buildings were constructed in Brisbane. These included: Mutual Life & Citizens (MLC) Insurance Building (1955); Friendly Society Building (1957), and the Taxation Building (1961). However, by the middle of 1964, 20 highrise office buildings were in the course of construction in the Brisbane CBD. The number of buildings constructed between 1965 and the end of 1970 far exceeded the previous 15 years. These included: Pearl Assurance Building, Eagle Towers, and Commonwealth Savings Bank Building (1966); Manufacturers Mutual Insurance (MMI) Building, and Main Roads Department Building (1967); Temperance & General (T&G) Insurance Building (1969), and; Westpac Bank Building, and Mount Isa Mines (MIM) Building (1970).

Highrise office buildings designed and constructed between c. 1950 and c. 1970 are a specific type of architecture that evolved under particular circumstances. The type clearly represents the excitement, prosperity, and vision of Australia and indicates the economic rationalism and progress in the period. Indicating their status, they were often ceremoniously opened by important dignitaries. In cities nationally and internationally, Modernist architects were unencumbered by traditions when designing this new type, challenging aesthetic and symbolic values, and the provision of public and private amenity. Their impact was unprecedented and it was not until critical analysis of tall buildings in the late 1960s that the approach to highrise development changed. Designed in a time when Australia was little concerned about the ethics of energy consumption, typical highrises exploited this abundance. Orientation and shading was generally dismissed and windows were inoperable, relying on mechanical air-conditioning. Floor plates were vast, relying on artificial light. However, some architects designed intelligent buildings that were connected to the traditions of architecture and were better attuned to their environment. Sophisticated in its design, Langer's MRD Building is representative of the better designs in Queensland of the period.

The principal characteristics of highrise office buildings designed and constructed in the 1950s and 1960s are: remarkable height to footprint ratio; an expressive and all-encompassing Modernist aesthetic; reinforced concrete construction; a "glamorous" treatment of the ground floor/primary entry; an urban, public space used as setting for the building; rationalisation and repetition of the floor plan; and integration of state-of-the-art office technology and staff facilities.

The new head office for the Main Roads Department possessed these principal characteristics. The 50-metre (160 ft) tall building comprised three large basement levels, a generously proportioned ground level with a mezzanine, a tower of nine levels, and a roof-level caretaker's flat. The building had a huge gross floor area of 33,000 square metres and upon completion was the largest reinforced concrete office building in Queensland. The principal public function of the building, vehicle registration, occupied the ground and mezzanine floors within impressive, robust, and dramatic spaces. The double-height main reception area was well-lit through "immense" glazing onto the forecourt and featured striking marble, timber, and terrazzo surfaces. Artworks commissioned for the building were prominently displayed. Designed as a showplace for the Queensland Government, the building and grounds were floodlit at night.

As well as occupying pre-existing buildings, the Queensland Government constructed purpose-built buildings to accommodate its administration and departmental offices in Brisbane. These buildings were reflective of the circumstances of the government and illustrate its operations over time.

The Main Roads Department building was purpose-designed, accommodating the Main Roads Department's diverse uses in repetitive and rationalised floor plates. Although offices and administration areas comprised the majority, the building also included: basement car parking; food facilities for the staff - a large cafeteria with kitchen, kiosk for snacks, and lunch room; staff training facilities - a large, double-height auditorium with the latest projection equipment; a technical and recreation library; a room for displaying models of major Main Roads projects, and; a large air-conditioning plant and a caretaker's flat. The building was designed to incorporate modern office technology. The department's technical and commercial electronic data processing divisions were accommodated in the basement, including their state of the art computer, the largest in Queensland at the time. The computer was serviced by a special, independent air-conditioning system, designed to keep the computer room at a constant temperature and humidity, with the heat generated by the computer absorbed by the ornamental ponds at the front of the building. A system of vacuum message tubes connected all sections of the building and there were telephones and a master clock system, CCTV, a teleprinter system, a Xerox machine, and a dumbwaiter for the movement of files between floors.

The building was completed in August 1967. In September the MRD moved more than 1250 personnel, from eight offices, into its new $4.5 million head office. The building was officially opened on 6 November 1967 by Frank Nicklin, Premier of Queensland, who stated that "this new building, with its modern appointments, the latest business equipment - including a computer - research and design facilities, will greatly enhance the department's work and its world-class reputation".

The new head office was commended at the time. It featured in the 7 September 1967 edition of The Queensland Master Builder, which detailed the building's construction techniques and highlighted its modern technology. According to the MRD's magazine Queensland Roads, there were hopes "that the construction of this building with its landscaped gardens and surroundings in the old Spring Hill area of Brisbane, [would] provide an incentive for other businesses and developers to follow the example of the Main Roads Department". Commissioner Barton viewed the MRD as "a giant consulting engineers and construction organisation", and stated "why should a department like Main Roads be any different from private business ... [W]e hope that when our officers are dealing with people they will get the idea that we are here to do business just as efficiently and effectively as anybody else in the community". The Courier-Mail added that "the building design, layout of office space and staff facilities, gives the Main Roads Department an air of big business, not the traditional Government department organisation", while the Mines and Main Roads Minister, Ronald Ernest Camm, claimed that the new building "would be one of the most effective ways of organising Main Roads personnel and facilities for a bolder attack on the problems of the future".

The new "luxury" head office was only part of the MRD's building program. By the end of the 1960s the department had also constructed new buildings to accommodate its new regional offices in Rockhampton, Cloncurry, Barcaldine, Toowoomba, Mackay, and Warwick, which had responsibility over their local main roads.

In c. 1969 the artwork Communications by important Queensland sculptor, Leonard Shillam, was installed at the MRD building in Spring Hill. It was commissioned for the building in 1968, made in cast aluminium over painted concrete, and depicted a bas relief map with a rural area and urban area connected by a road.

Langer died in 1969. As an architect and town planner, he had a pronounced impact upon the built environment of Australia, especially in Queensland. Having a deep belief in community responsibilities, particularly in cultural matters, he had been active in the Royal Australian Institute of Architects; first president (1952) of the Queensland division of the Royal Australian Planning Institute; a founder and chairman (1966–68) of the Queensland Association of Landscape Architects; and a member (1963–69) of the National Trust of Queensland. Important examples of his architectural work include the Langer residence at St Lucia (1950); Mackay Sugar Research Institute (1953); Lennon's Hotel Broadbeach (1957, demolished) and Lennon's Hotel Toowoomba (1957); St John's Lutheran Church, Bundaberg (1960); Kingaroy Town Hall and Civic Square (1963); Assembly Hall at Ipswich Girls' Grammar School (1964); and St Peter's Lutheran College Chapel, Indooroopilly (1968). He was responsible for notable urban ideas of the 1950s and 1960s, including choosing the sites of the Sydney Opera House and the Australian Parliament House; the pedestrian shopping mall in Queen Street, Brisbane; and the first canal development of the Gold Coast. After his death, both The University of Queensland and The Queensland Institute (later University) of Technology with the Australian Institute of Landscape Architects established annual student prizes in memoriam. His body of work is a clearly distinguishable exploration of a sub-tropical modernism and is important in the evolution of Queensland architecture, with Langer described as "arguably the most influential architect of the 1950s".

From the head office, the MRD administered its important work. Motor vehicle ownership continued to rise and the highway network in Queensland was expanded substantially in the 1970s and 1980s. In the 1990s and 2000s the department's work became more sophisticated to cope with increased traffic. By the end of the 2010s the department was responsible for the state's largest built community asset - the Queensland state-controlled road network, worth over $46 billion and carrying more than 85% of the state's traffic. Examples of major main roads projects co-ordinated from the head office include: the Southeast Freeway (1972), the Beef Roads and Developmental Roads schemes of the 1970s, the Bald Hills to Burpengary Deviation of the Bruce Highway (1977) and many subsequent upgrades and extensions of the highway, the Gateway Arterial Road and Bridge (1986), and the Pacific Motorway (2000).

Over time the head office building was altered. In c. 1974 the fountain jets of the forecourt pond were altered to stacked boulder waterfalls. The building was also altered internally to accommodate different office fit-outs. In 2006 the forecourt of the building was remodelled to a design by architects, BAC Group to provide building code compliant pedestrian access to the front entrance. This work included replacement of the original awning with a modern, steel and glass awning, adding two concrete ramps to the entrance bridge, altering the forecourt gardens and ponds, and installing the sculpture The Red Cube at the front of the building.

While the building was being painted in 2007 it was identified approximately 6% of the render on the northern sun hoods needed repair. The hoods were investigated by structural engineers, no sign of structural distress was identified, and trial repairs of the render were undertaken in 2008.

In March 2009 the MRD merged with Queensland Transport to form the Department of Transport and Main Roads, which continued the control of the state's main roads. In 2012 the department vacated the MRD building.

The building was sold to Asian Pacific Group Pty Ltd in December 2013 for $22 million. After a three-year renovation, it opened on 16 September 2016 as The Johnson, a mixed-use property containing a signature Art Series boutique hotel, residential apartments, serviced offices, with rooftop pool and terrace, and adjoining restaurant, bar and café.

== Description ==
The former Main Roads Department Building is a 15-storey, reinforced concrete office building in a Modernist style that stands on a prominent site on Boundary Road, Spring Hill, Brisbane. Totalling almost one hectare, the rectangular site is bounded by Boundary Street to the south, Fortescue Street to the east, and Wedd Street to the north. Small-scale commercial and residential development adjoins the western boundary. The sloping terrain is terraced into large, flat platforms by concrete retaining walls. As well as a landscaped garden setting, the building comprises: a front portico; tower; service core; rear podium; and rear carpark. The building structure is a reinforced concrete grid of concrete columns supporting concrete floor slabs.

The building retains design elements characteristic of the work of its architect, Dr Karl Langer, such as: employing a hybrid of subtle Classical allusions and Modernist architectural devices including a forecourt and stylised colonnade front; simplified forms, decoration and spatial arrangements; a restrained use of high-quality materials; and careful siting and manipulation of form to achieve optimum orientation for natural light and ventilation.

The garden forecourt is a flat public space fronting Boundary Street. The garden is laid out in sharp and dynamic lines of concrete, defining contrasting flat areas of mature trees, grass, paths and water to create a bold, abstract effect. A wide entrance path from the street bisects the garden, bridging across a pond and stepping up to the front portico entrance. The Red Cube, a large metal sculpture, stands on the path in front of a marble slab engraved to commemorate the opening of the building.

The western garden is terraced into level areas, retained by concrete walls and linked with concrete stairs. It retains the original abstract layout and also contains mature trees, shrubs, grassed areas and original concrete benches. The eastern garden is narrow and defined by a series of terraced boulder retaining beds and also retains original concrete benches.

The front portico is a rectangular block attached to the tower that, on approach, gives the impression of a grand colonnade across the width of a tall ground floor. This is formed by a rhythmic series of white, smooth-rendered, rectangular concrete columns topped by a low parapet. This is in-filled with large panels of dark aluminium-framed inoperable glazing. The main elevation is symmetrical except for the entrance doors, which are placed off-centre. The windowless side elevations (east and west) of the portico are pale yellow facebrick walls in stretcher bond. The portico has a concealed flat roof clad with metal rib and pan sheeting.

The tower is the major component of the building, comprising 14 levels (B3 to L10) and a rooftop plant room and caretaker's flat (L11). The tower is a tall, narrow, rectangular block with a concealed timber-framed hipped roof clad with metal pan and rib sheeting. It is oriented with its long sides (the front and rear) facing north and south. These elevations are highly glazed with an external grid of white-painted, concrete sun hoods forming a shading "egg crate". The hoods on the northern side project further than the south. The windows are large, double glazed aluminium framed casements and have spandrel panels inset with a chunky, white quartz aggregate. The window hardware has been removed from the sashes. The side (eastern and western) elevations are painted concrete, finely articulated with off-form-patterned panels. Largely windowless in comparison to the north and south, the eastern and western elevations have four columns of small, square aluminium-framed windows with opaque glass.

The service core projects from the rear (northern side) of the tower with walls of painted concrete with off-form-patterned panels. The core fenestration is minimal, contrasting with the ample glazing of the adjacent northern elevation of the tower. The east and west elevations of the core have long, narrow ribbons of windows with high sills, and the north elevation has a column of small windows with a high sill and a spandrel panel of quartz aggregate. On the roof of the service core and the tower is a large, facebrick plant room and air-conditioning machinery.

Abutting the northern side of the tower is the rectangular rear podium, which stretches the width of the building and comprises four levels (G, B1, B2, and B3) and a rooftop deck (L1). The side elevations are pale yellow facebrick in stretcher bond with rhythmically placed square windows. The northern elevation has an egg crate of white-painted, concrete sun hoods sheltering large, aluminium-framed windows. The windows have spandrel panels featuring dark slates.

The rear carpark stands behind the rear podium, accessed from the lowest level of the building (B3) and from Wedd Street at the rear. It is one-storey with a flat, steel-framed roof clad with metal pan and rib sheeting, pierced by large, rhythmic openings to the sky. A decorative lattice wall of painted concrete breezeblocks lines the Wedd Street boundary, screening the car park. Internally, the former functions of the building are clearly defined, with public entry and reception in the front portico; offices in the tower; vertical circulation, toilets, and other shared facilities in the core; offices and a semi-enclosed carpark in the rear podium; and car parks and store rooms in the rear car park.

The public entry and double-height reception area are intact and feature black and white terrazzo floors, and marble-clad walls, columns, reception desk, planterbox and window sills. An original wall-mounted bronze artwork depicting the historical evolution of the wheel is retained in the entrance foyer. Within the front portico, L1 is a mezzanine level retaining original balustrades: iron near the southern glazing and battened timber above the reception area. Mounted on the end wall of the lift foyer facing the front entrance is Communications, a large artwork by Leonard Shillam.

The tower levels (L1 - L9) each comprise long, open floor plans with later lightweight partitions. Window sills are black terrazzo. Small services cores bookend each floor, on the east and west sides of the tower. These contain fire stairs, service risers, store rooms, and kitchenettes. Some levels retain original black bean veneer fire doors. The top level of the tower (L10) contains two large auditoriums. The larger of the two, named the Charles Barton Auditorium, is double-height and has a raised stage with a proscenium arch, velvet curtains, wings spaces either side, and a backstage area with changing rooms. Under the stage is a storage area accessed via original, battened timber doors. The auditoriums are serviced by a single projection room on a mezzanine between the rooms, accessed via a narrow timber stair.

On the roof of the tower is a caretaker's flat, accessed via a narrow concrete stair. It is a modest, timber-framed, three-bedroomed apartment, concealed behind the tower parapet and sheltered under the main roof. It has pale yellow facebrick walls and aluminium-framed windows with original hardware (sliding and double-hung sashes). The front door addresses a generous, north-facing, roofed patio area, paved with square concrete pavers. The layout of the flat is original; however, all ceiling linings have been removed. The kitchen, bathroom, and laundry fitouts are early and it retains early electric monitor boards used by the caretaker to supervise the building.

The service core contains service risers and shared facilities, including lifts, a fire stair, dumb waiter for office files, tearooms, and large toilet and shower rooms. The fire stair in the service core retains original finishes, including black and white terrazzo stair treads and risers, black-painted metal balustrades with black plastic handrails, textured stair undersides, and vinyl tile clad walls with contrasting inset floor numerals.

The rear podium levels (B3 - G) each comprise large, open floor plans with later lightweight partitions. Window sills are black terrazzo.

Early floodlights survive mounted to the exterior of the building.

Elements that are not of cultural heritage include: the building's ramps, awning, and doors at the main entrance portico; lightweight partitions and suspended ceilings throughout; kitchen and store room fitouts; and steel shelters of the garden and roof deck.

The former Main Roads Department Building stands prominently on a ridge of the folding terrain of Spring Hill. It is highly visible from the surrounding suburbs and has extensive views from the office spaces within. The gardens and open spaces are conspicuous within the immediate streetscape and contribute to the character of the area.

== Heritage listing ==
The former Department of Main Roads Building was listed on the Queensland Heritage Register on 13 June 2014 having satisfied the following criteria.

The place is important in demonstrating the evolution or pattern of Queensland's history.

The former Main Roads Department Building (1967) is important in demonstrating the Queensland Government's response to the rise in mass motoring in the second half of the twentieth century. Purpose-built to consolidate and modernise the department's activities associated with expanding and upgrading the state's road network, it was the largest reinforced concrete office building in Queensland at the time of its construction, illustrating the importance of Main Roads operations and contribution to the state's economic advancement.

The place is also important in demonstrating the evolution of Queensland architecture as a good, intact example of a substantial, architect-designed building in a Modernist style adapted to suit local conditions.

The place is important in demonstrating the principal characteristics of a particular class of cultural places.

The place is a good, intact and representative example of the work of architect, Dr Karl Langer, and is important in demonstrating the principal characteristics of his work. Most notably, it: displays a hybrid of subtle Classical allusions and Modernist architectural devices including a forecourt and stylised colonnade front; features characteristic simplified forms, decoration and spatial arrangements and a restrained use of high-quality materials; is sited and its form is manipulated for optimum orientation for natural light and ventilation of the interior, and; is designed to be fit for purpose. As the largest commission of his career, it is a rare illustration of Langer's principles applied on a large scale.

The place is a good, intact and representative example of a mid-twentieth century highrise office building in Queensland. It is important in demonstrating the principal characteristics of this type, including: notable height to footprint ratio; expressive and all-encompassing Modernist aesthetic; reinforced concrete construction; refined treatment of the ground floor/primary entry; urban, public space used as setting for the building; rationalisation and repetition of the floor plan; and integration of state-of-the-art office technology and staff facilities.

The place is important because of its aesthetic significance.

Notable for its landmark attributes and expressive architectural qualities, the place is important for its aesthetic significance.

The former Main Roads Department Building is highly visible from the surrounding suburb and maintains an imposing streetscape presence. Modernist in style, the building's simplified sculptural form is distinguished through a variety of treatments, including off-form textured concrete, stone spandrel panels, facebrick, egg-crate screening and breeze blocks. The abstract, graphic layout of the forecourt and side gardens, including pond and entrance bridge, and; the use of high-quality Queensland materials and artworks in the public reception areas complete the design.

The place has a special association with the life or work of a particular person, group or organisation of importance in Queensland's history.

Designed to accommodate the department and to express its work, the place has a strong and special association with the Main Roads Department, which had a crucial influence on the economic and social development of Queensland during the twentieth century. It served as the head office for the department for 45 years.
