= St Peters Lutheran College Chapel =

Heritage-listed chapel in Indooroopilly, Brisbane, Australia

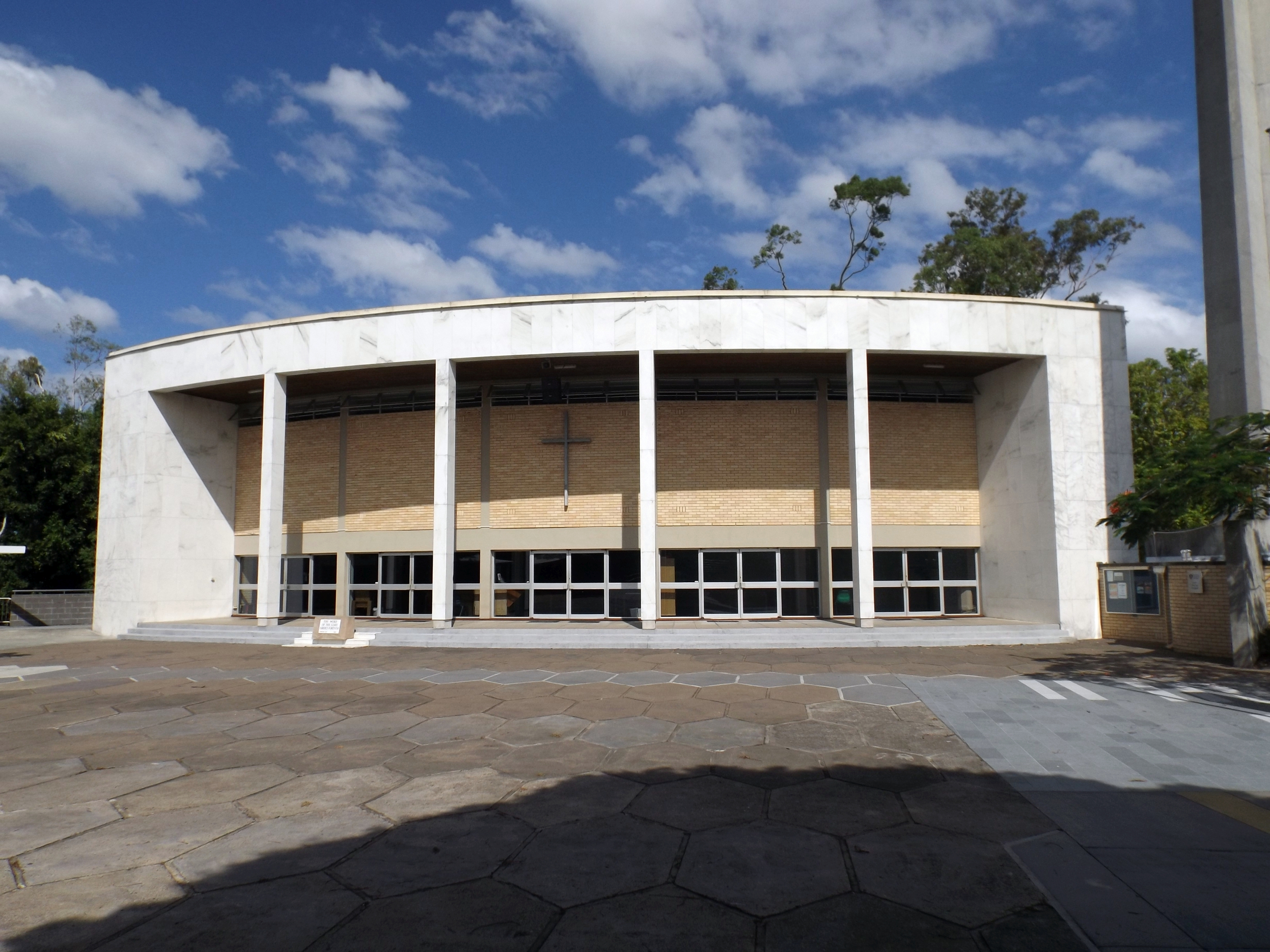
- Front of the building, 2014

- Location within Queensland Location within Australia
- 27.5049°S 152.985°E
- Location: St Peters Lutheran College, Brisbane, Australia

History
- Design period: 1940s–1960s (post-World War II)
- Built: 1968
- Built for: St Peters Lutheran College

Site notes
- Architect: Karl Langer
- Architectural style: Modernism

Queensland Heritage Register
- Official name: Chapel of St Peter's Lutheran College, Indooroopilly
- Type: state heritage (built)
- Designated: 7 December 2012
- Reference no.: 602816
- Significant period: 1968
- Significant components: chapel, spire, pathway/walkway, courtyard, bell – church, memorial – war
- Builders: W. W. Groom

St Peters Lutheran College Chapel is a heritage-listed chapel on the campus of St Peters Lutheran College in Indooroopilly, Brisbane, Australia. It was designed by Karl Langer and built in 1968 by W. W. Groom. It was added to the Queensland Heritage Register on 7 December 2012.

== History ==
The Chapel of St Peter's Lutheran College built in 1968, was designed by architect, Dr Karl Langer as the centrepiece of the school grounds, complete with a tree-lined plaza, forecourt, bell tower, and reflecting pool. The chapel is used regularly by the school and the local Lutheran parish for liturgical and general assembly purposes and remains central to the school community.

The area now known as Indooroopilly was surveyed in 1858 and first settled in 1860. The area was subdivided into farms and later into residential allotments. Prior to 1870 there were few houses built in the area but settlement of the district received impetus from the opening of the Brisbane to Ipswich railway in 1875. During the 1880s and 1890s Indooroopilly developed as a fashionable suburb. Many substantial, architect-designed residences were built on large allotments.

Indoocombe was a large brick house built in Indooroopilly in c. 1897. It became the home of the Munro family who renamed it Ross Roy and the house and its substantial grounds became a centre of high society life. Photographs from this time show the grounds immediately surrounding the house to be landscaped and well maintained and the remainder of the property being native growth with a cleared and grassed understorey. The Munros lived at Ross Roy until their deaths. After the finalisation of the estate, Ross Roy was sold to the Lutheran Church in December 1944 for £16,000. The villa occupied 16 acres (6.5 ha) and was established as St Peter's Lutheran College opening 25 February 1945.

Lutheranism is a major branch of Christianity and places a strong emphasis on education. In 1838 the first Lutherans arrived in Australia from Prussia and established communities in South Australia and Moreton Bay. That year a group of German Lutheran and Presbyterian missionaries established Zion Hill (at present day Nundah), a mission for Christianising aborigines, on the outskirts of Moreton Bay Penal Colony. It was not considered successful and was abandoned in 1848. In 1857 Lutheran Pastor Carl Franz Alexander Schirmeister came to Moreton Bay and established congregations at Brisbane CDB, South Brisbane, Ipswich, and Toowoomba. He obtained Government grants of land for church use and the first church was built in North Brisbane in 1861, followed quickly by churches at the other locations. Over the following decades Lutheranism was spread across Queensland. Around 1859 the newly formed colony of Queensland launched a vigorous immigration policy that continued for over 40 years. It attracted many Germans who formed distinct communities amidst the essentially-British nation. Although only a minority of these Germans were Lutheran, across the state Lutheran congregations grew and some established Lutheran schools.

With the introduction of the state school system at the turn of the century, Queensland Lutheran schools disappeared as the state school system grew. By 1914 there were no operational Lutheran schools in Queensland and a period of low activity of Lutheran education followed during the interwar and World War II (WWII) period partly due to anti-German sentiment.

A gradual resurgence of independent schools began in the last half of the twentieth century with government financial assistance in the late 1960s. This resulted in a Lutheran school boom in Australia between the 1970s and the 1990s and in 2012 Queensland had 27 Lutheran schools educating over 20,000 students. This resurgence of Lutheran schools in Queensland started in 1945 with the establishment of St Peter's Lutheran College at Indooroopilly. The Courier Mail described it as "the first Lutheran secondary school in Queensland". The school was co-educational and attendance was open to boarders and day school children of all denominations. The school was intended to be a northern adjunct and feeder to Australian Lutheran College#Immanuel Seminary in Adelaide where they would be prepared to serve as pastors and in other ministries. On opening day the school received £226/14/8 in donations, ear-marked for the addition of a chapel.

A Chapel Fund was established and fundraising activities began. In February 1948 a temporary chapel was dedicated in a former officers' mess building of the Australian Women's Army Service camp. The AWAS camp had occupied part of the Munro estate and the school moved the mess building to the centre of the school campus. In September 1948 the school completed Luther House, a two-storey building of classrooms. The upper storey temporarily housed the chapel until a permanent chapel could be built.

The 1950s and 1960s was an era of religious vitality in Australia. During this period the nation was in a sustained economic boom, was led by conservative governments, and was experiencing high population growth. The congregations of major religions expanded and church attendance and religious society membership rose with accompanying financial improvement. Suburban churches regularly reported record congregation attendances for major holy days. Membership of the Lutheran church also increased after WWII with the major influx of European migrants. In the early to mid 1960s a number of the major Christian religions altered the way they ministered to their congregation in order to re-establish themselves within the modern world. With increased incomes, increased congregations, and an increasingly modern approach, considerable building programs began. Spacious brick churches were built in a modern style, often replacing smaller timber churches.

In 1966 the Chapel Fund had raised $59,995 and borrowed $70,000 for the construction of the chapel. Brisbane-based architect and town planner Dr Karl Langer was engaged as architect.

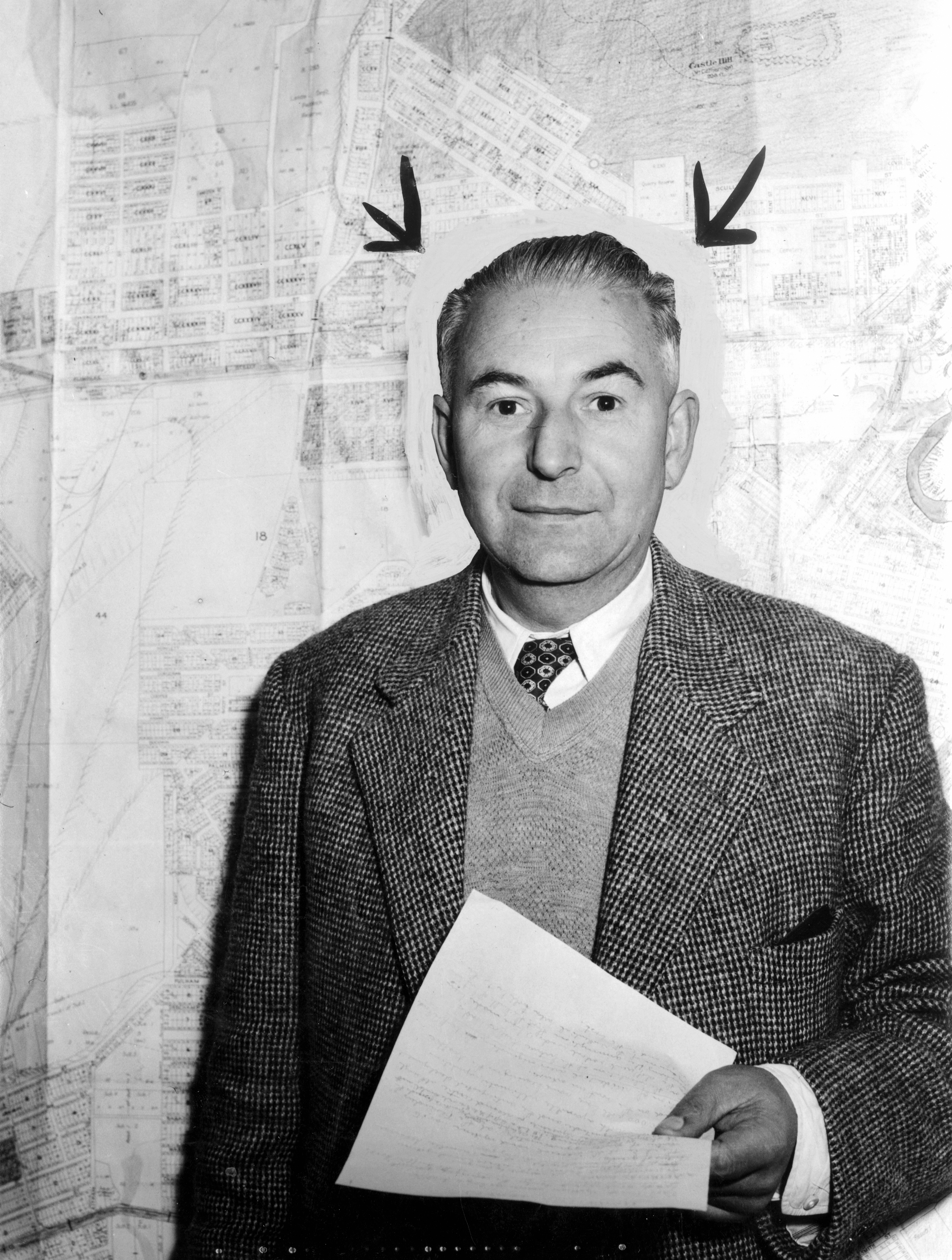
Dr Karl Langer, Brisbane, 1950

Dr Karl Langer (1903–1969) was born on 28 July 1903 in Vienna, Austria. He studied at the Vienna Academy of Fine Arts under the directorship of pioneer German modernist designer Peter Behrens and in 1928, the year of his graduation, he was employed by Behrens to run his office in Vienna. In 1933 he was awarded a Doctor of Philosophy for his thesis entitled Origins and Development of Concrete Construction.

Dr Langer immigrated to Australia with his wife, Dr Gertrude Langer, in 1939, bringing direct experience of the European Modern Movement to Queensland. He gained temporary employment with architects Cook and Kerrison in Brisbane and from 1940 Dr Langer lectured part-time in architecture and architectural design at the University of Queensland, publishing Sub-Tropical Housing in 1944. This booklet explored issues related to house design and town planning in a sub-tropical climate and influenced many architects working in the post-WWII era.

In 1944 Dr Langer was employed as an assistant town planner in the Brisbane City Council. From 1945, he was commissioned to work on a range of town planning projects for Darwin, Ingham, Toowoomba, Yeppoon, Kingaroy, Mount Isa, Mackay and for the National Capital Development Commission, Canberra. Concurrently, he completed numerous architectural projects of a wide variety including small, economical domestic work and large commercial and institutional work.

As an architect and town planner, Dr Langer had a pronounced impact upon the built environment of Australia, especially in Queensland, from the 1940s until his death in 1969. Along with numerous cultural pursuits, he was active in the Royal Australian Institute of Architects; first president (1952) of the Queensland division of the Royal Australian Planning Institute; a founder and chairman (1966–68) of the Queensland Association of Landscape Architects; and a member (1963–69) of the National Trust of Queensland. Important examples of his architectural work include the Langer residence at St Lucia (1950); Sugar Research Institute at Mackay (1953); St John's Lutheran Church, Bundaberg (1960); Kingaroy Town Hall and Civic Square (1963); Assembly Hall at Ipswich Girls' Grammar School (1964); Main Roads Building at Spring Hill (1966); Lennon's Hotel at Broadbeach (1957); and Lennon's Hotel Toowoomba. His body of work is a clearly distinguishable exploration of a sub-tropical modernism that culminates in the Chapel of St Peter's Lutheran College, Indooroopilly, his last built work.

Modernism developed in pre-World War I Europe and gained popularity in Australia post-WWII. It was more than a design style and is notable for a rationalising of planning emphasising clarity and simplicity of form and detailing. American and Scandinavian influences were strong in Australia. During the 1950s and 1960s a similar rationalisation occurred within Christian religions in an effort to modernise approaches to religious practice. Churches became brighter and simpler in form and decorative treatments. They used new materials and forms while incorporating many traditional elements and symbols. Design responses included variations on the medieval church with simple massing, a rectangular nave stripped of apses, aisles and chapels, a dramatically lit sanctuary rear wall and simple belltower.

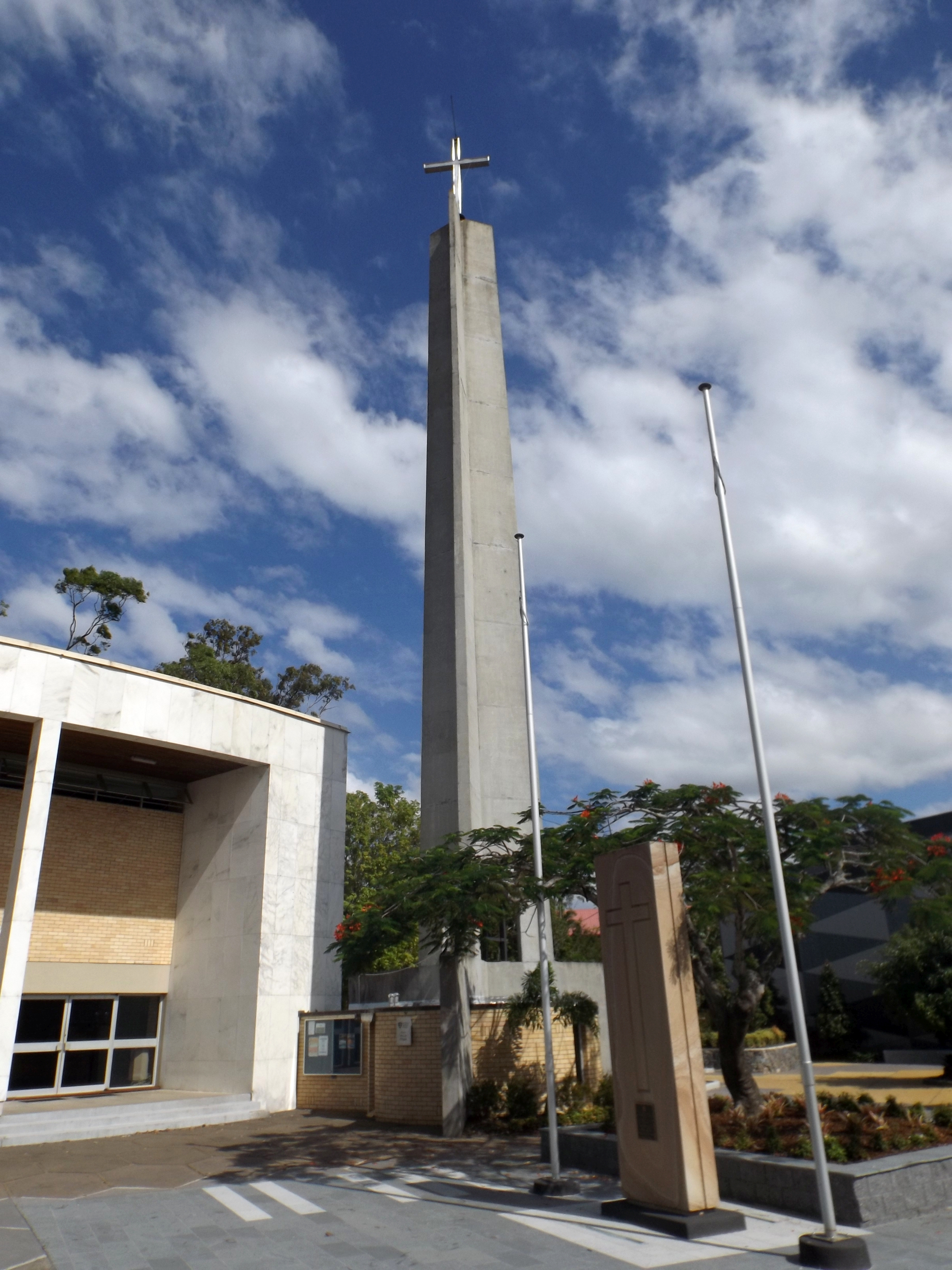
The very tall bell tower, 2014

Influenced by the architecture of classical Greece and the modernist ideas of contemporary European architecture, Dr Langer developed a sophisticated hybrid of classical and modern principles of design bridging modern and traditional architecture. Typically, Dr Langer explored the idea of the conjunction of landscape and landmark and his designs often involve a designed landscape incorporating the building. At St Peter's, Dr Langer proposed a fan-shaped chapel with a very tall bell tower and a round concrete reflecting pool behind a paved forecourt at the end of a tree lined plaza. The front of the chapel was a crisp, curved colonnade-a stylised temple front-clad in marble. The other walls were yellow face brick with a projecting pattern of crosses on the east wall exterior.

Langer's design for the Chapel of St Peter's Lutheran College was in a modernist style and typical of his architectural concepts. Langer's exploration of modernism was heavily influenced by context. He studied the local fauna and flora in Queensland and the climate and his work interprets this in a Modernist manner. Dr Langer integrated native planting into his schemes; at St Peter's he proposed hedges of lemon scented tea trees for the plaza. He typically exploited passive lighting and ventilation in intelligent and uncomplicated ways; at St Peter's his design includes simple methods of passive ventilation and a naturally lit interior.

By 1966 when the design of the chapel was nearing completion, Dr Langer had a strong connection with the Lutheran community of Queensland and with St Peter's Lutheran College. He had previously designed and had constructed St John's Lutheran Church, Bundaberg (1960) and St John's Lutheran Church, Ipswich (1961). At St Peter's College, he had completed a chaplain's residence (1954), a dormitory block (1954–55), a dining hall block (1966), and a concrete footbridge (1966–67). The dormitory block and a 12-foot-tall (3.7 m) sandstone monolith was a memorial to Queensland Lutheran servicemen killed in WWII. The monolith was a gift by Langer to the school and, at the time, was believed to be the largest stone in Brisbane. A cross was carved on one side with servicemen's name son the other. Langer went on to complete a science block (1967–68) and the entrance fence and gates (1968). The plaza and forecourt connected some of these buildings in a coherent, ordered manner, e.g. the stylised temple fronted dining hall addressed the plaza and forecourt, referencing classical Greek town centres, suggesting Dr Langer had a masterplan for the site. In lectures for architecture students at the University of Queensland he referenced the design of St Peter's chapel and its context (the forecourt/plaza and surrounding buildings) as an example of applying the European model of a functional town square to the college campus. Importantly, the design was symbolic of the essence of Lutheran education-an axis with theology (the chapel) at one end and learning (the library) at the other.

Dr Langer carefully incorporated Christian symbolism within the design of the chapel. The fan shape concentrates the gaze to the altar; lights are hidden from the nave to remove any distraction from this focus. The curved east wall is plain and dominated by the Cross (a symbol of the resurrection), seemingly floating in a strong light symbolising the rising sun. References to the Holy Trinity can be seen in the altar (constructed of three pieces), the three-finned bell tower and the three windows in the mediation chapel.

Tenders for the construction of the chapel were called in February 1967. Local contractor WW Groom's tender of $123,938 (the lowest of nine) was accepted on 6 February 1967. Groom had also won the contracts for other Langer buildings at St Peter's. The foundation stone was laid 17 September 1967 and the chapel was opened and dedicated 14 June 1968 with Dr M Lohe, President General of the Lutheran Church, as guest speaker. Dr Langer and Groom attended and were involved in the ceremony.

A large timber crucifix was commissioned for the wall within the small round room of the meditation chapel. It was carved by Alfred Schubert, a Czech-born woodcarver from Melbourne who had trained in Bavaria. Schubert had previously carved a crucifix for Langer's St John's Lutheran Church at Bundaberg. The crucifix was dramatically lit and loomed large within the room.

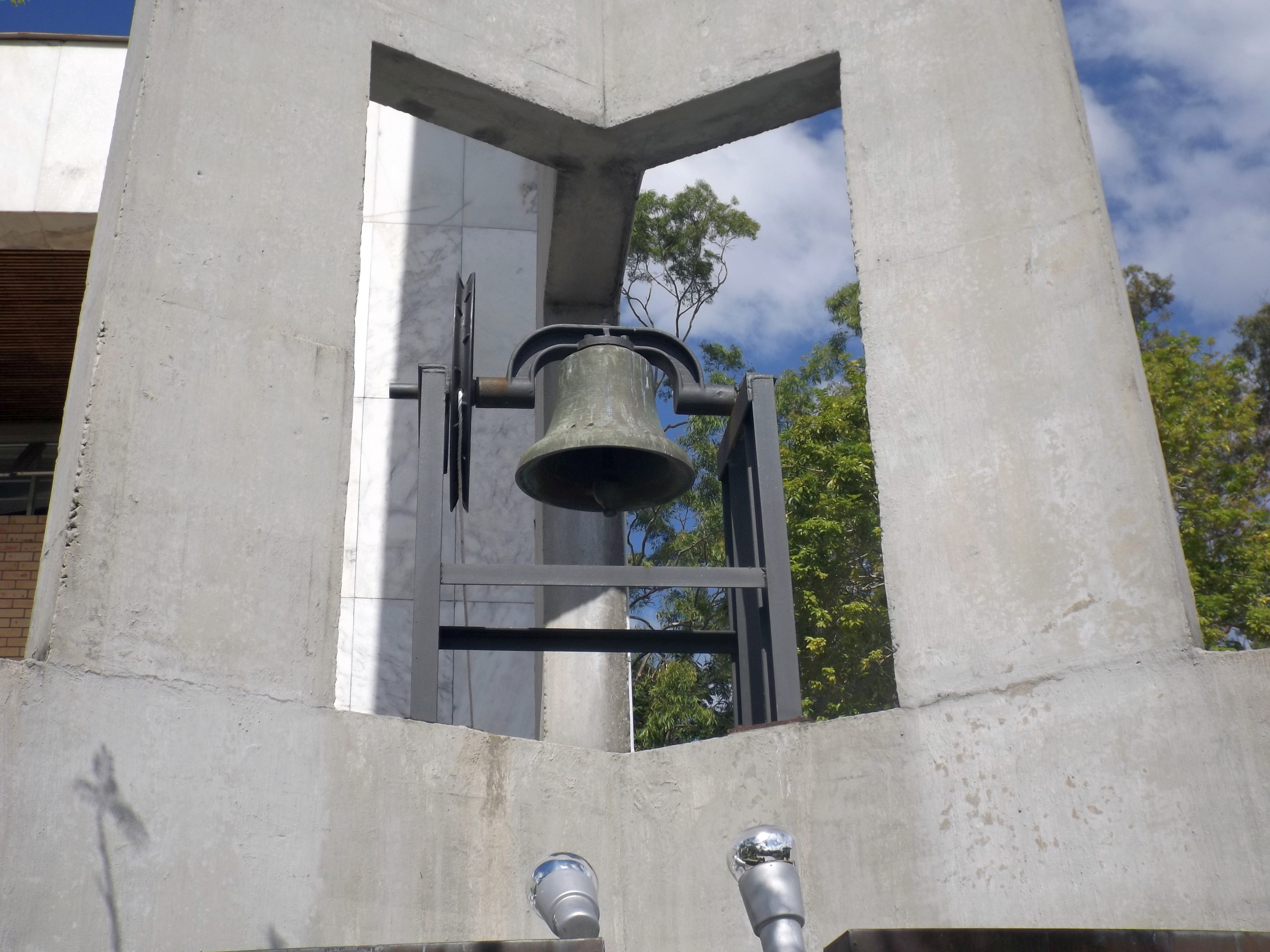
Chapel bell, 2014

The chapel bell was donated by Pastor Franz Finger who was closely associated with the establishment of St Peter's and in its ongoing ministry and served on the College Council.

Dr Langer died in 1969 and his funeral service was conducted at the chapel. It has been said that Dr Langer considered the chapel to be his favourite building. He was cremated at Mt Thompson Crematorium, where he had designed the east chapel built in 1962.

There has been little alteration to the chapel over time. Aluminium blade sun shades have been added to some windows and the crucifix in the mediation chapel has been removed. The reflecting pond in the forecourt has been removed. A wide concrete ramp has been added in the forecourt probably replacing a wide stair.

At some time, the large sandstone WWII memorial monolith was moved from its earlier position on the northern side of the boys' dormitory to the southern edge of the chapel forecourt.

The chapel has been the only local Lutheran church in Indooroopilly since 1968 and services for the Lutheran parish are conducted weekly. The chapel, forecourt and plaza have acted as the physical and spiritual centre of the campus and continue to do so. The chapel is regularly used as an auditorium for the college and hosts performances, ceremonies and general assemblies. Larger assemblies and ANZAC day commemorations are held in the forecourt.

== Description ==
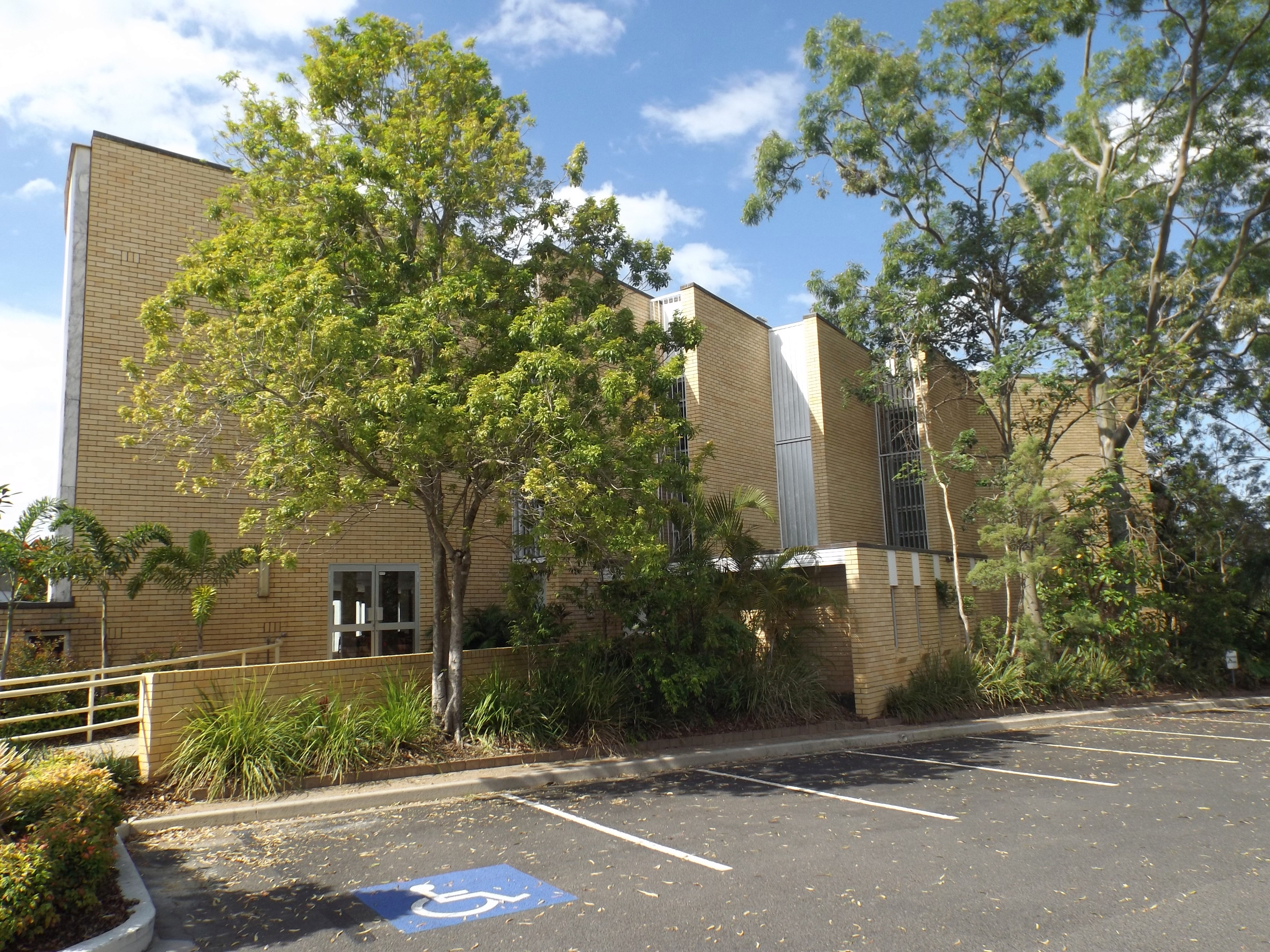
Building side, 2014

The Chapel of St Peter's Lutheran College, Indooroopilly, is a fan-shaped building with a bell tower and large concrete paved forecourt terminating a tree-lined plaza. The plaza runs generally from west to east along a high ridge of land within the college campus. The tall bell tower is surmounted by a cross which can be seen from across the area.

The gently curved temple front entrance faces west. Three concrete steps lead up to a tall portico running across the face of the building. Four slender square columns divide the front into five bays. The portico is clad with marble presenting a high-quality face to the building that glows strikingly in the setting sun.

At the southern end of the front a tall bell tower made of three concrete fins squats over a small round drum of the meditation chapel, attached to the building by a slender covered corridor. The bell is mounted at the base of the tower and has raised letters, "ST. PETERS 1967".

The rear wall of the portico reveals the concrete structure infilled with panels of yellow face brick. The portico ceiling is lined with dark-stained timber battens. Aluminium-framed glass doors open from the portico into the chapel. High level aluminium framed awning windows light the interior choir loft.

The north and south elevations are yellow face brick and comprise a series of stepped blade walls with west-facing windows. Secondary entrances to the nave are located along both sides and the low form of the vestry and consultation rooms project out of the south face. The eastern (rear) elevation has no windows and the field of yellow face bricks features a pattern of crosses made of projecting header bricks. The land falls away at the rear and long and narrow openings provide ventilation into the understorey and then up into the chapel via floor louvers behind the altar.

The nave is a wide fan narrowing to the altar at the east end. The floor slopes down to the altar. The wide balcony choir loft is tiered and overhangs the entire west end of the nave forming a low-ceilinged entry zone supported on slender square concrete columns. The balcony balustrade is dark-stained timber battens and forms a sweeping curve. The balcony is reached via timber stairs at both ends of the entry area. The body of the chapel is a large space, brightly lit and uncluttered. The high white ceiling curves seamlessly into the east wall behind the altar where a large timber cross that appears to float on the white field is mounted.

The north and south walls are yellow face brick and the windows are positioned so they are shielded from the nave and their light is directed eastward onto the altar. The pews are darkly stained timber and are crafted to sit on the sloping floor, progressively shorter towards the altar to suit the reducing width of the nave. The floor of the nave is clear finished timber under the pews and russet-coloured carpet in the entry, aisles and sanctuary. The sanctuary is reached by two steps and a third step supports the altar. The altar is made of large thick slabs of Helidon sandstone with the front carved with the Greek letters alpha and omega.

At the southern end a short stair leads down to a narrow, low-ceilinged corridor into the round meditation chapel. The floors of the corridor and meditation chapel are paved with glazed dark bricks and the walls are of yellow bricks. The ceiling of the meditation chapel is rough textured stucco. A large timber cross is fixed to the wall and the room contains timber kneelers and pews. Three long narrow windows light the small dark room.

The chapel contains timber furniture, sandstone font, framed portraits, metal candlesticks and a variety of liturgical items.

The forecourt is paved with concrete tiles in a stretched hexagonal pattern. It is approximately 40 metres (130 ft) square. The plaza has a concrete surface and is flanked on both sides by grass planted with Poinciana trees at regular intervals. This outdoor furniture and other plantings are not considered to be of cultural heritage significance.

On the southern side of the forecourt is a World War II memorial, a large sandstone monolith, standing within garden beds and grass and flanked by two steel flagpoles. The stone is carved with a cross and a Roll of Honour listing Queensland Lutherans who died in WWII. This is not considered to be of cultural heritage significance.

A corner of Luther House and the cafe extension to the dining hall encroach into the forecourt and plaza. They are not considered to be of cultural heritage significance.

== Heritage listing ==
Chapel of St Peter's Lutheran College, Indooroopilly was listed on the Queensland Heritage Register on 7 December 2012 having satisfied the following criteria.

The place is important in demonstrating the evolution or pattern of Queensland's history.

The Chapel of St Peter's Lutheran College, Indooroopilly, constructed in 1968, is important in demonstrating the growth and changing practices of Christian liturgies in Queensland between the 1950s and the 1970s, in particular of the Lutheran church, a religious denomination of importance in Queensland since 1838. The chapel in its setting is a strong symbolic gesture embodying the essence of Lutheran education with theology (the chapel) visually linked to learning (the library).

The chapel is important in demonstrating the strong influence of European modernist architecture in Queensland. As a highly intact modernist church, the chapel is important in representing modernist ecclesiastical architecture in Queensland during a period of significant re-evaluation and modernisation of Christian religions worldwide.

The place is important in demonstrating the principal characteristics of a particular class of cultural places.

The chapel is important in demonstrating the principal characteristics and qualities of a modernist church in Queensland. Highly intact, the chapel is notable for incorporating a dominant bell tower, large, well-lit nave shaped to focus to the sanctuary, a choir loft, vestry and stark, dramatic meditation chapel. The chapel is notable for its subtle incorporation of Christian symbolism including the positioning of the Cross floating on a strongly lit curving wall as a symbol of the rising sun and the use of three elements in the design of features like the bell tower, altar and meditation chapel.

The place is an exceptional example of the work of architect, Dr Karl Langer, embodying architectural principles he developed and refined over his career. Most notably, it incorporates classical architectural devices including a processional plaza, forecourt and stylised temple front; features characteristic simplified forms and spatial arrangements and a restrained use of good quality materials; and incorporates natural light and ventilation.

The place is important because of its aesthetic significance.

Notable for its quality design, materials and construction, the place is important for its aesthetic significance. The monumental bell tower is visible across the college and surrounding suburbs giving the chapel it's landmark qualities. The forecourt and plaza provide for views to and from the chapel, especially important for the symbolism in the visual link between the chapel and the library. The sculptural qualities of the chapel interior-including the curving east wall with floating Cross; use of white plaster finishes complementing timber panelling and pale brickwork; natural lighting from the west facing clear glazing in the bladed side walls and from glazing in the west wall-evoke feelings of awe and reverence. The main chapel is a dramatic contrast to the cave-like small meditation chapel which evokes sensations of introspection and contemplation.

The place has a special association with the life or work of a particular person, group or organisation of importance in Queensland's history.

The place, designed by Dr Karl Langer, has a special association with his life and work. It is the culmination of his architectural career and embodies the defining architectural principles he developed and employed. Dr Langer is an architect of importance to Queensland and was one of the earliest architects to promote a local variation of modernist architecture. His work, particularly on climatic design, inspired and influenced contemporary and later architects.
