= Karl Langer (architect) =

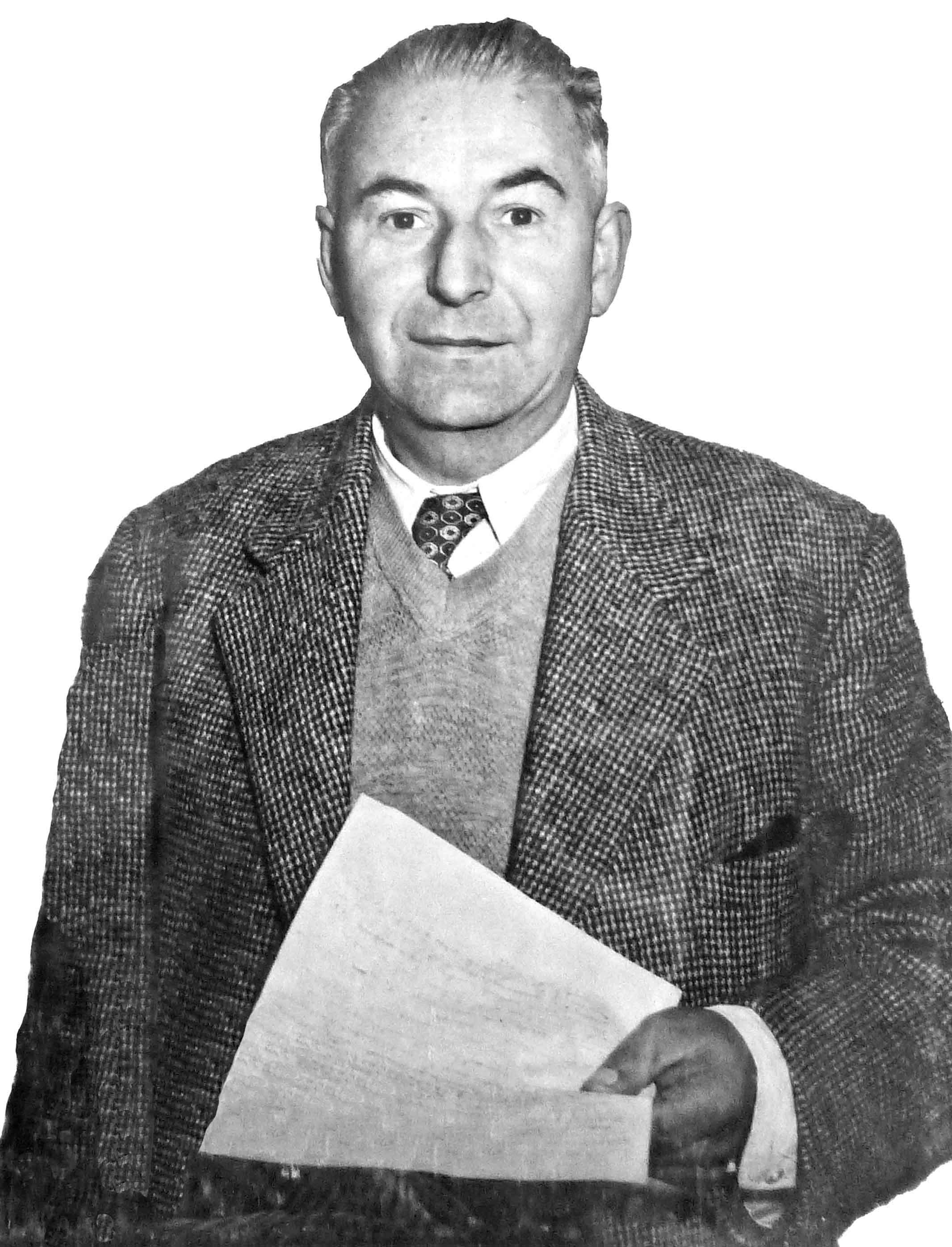
Dr Karl Langer, Brisbane, 1950

Karl Langer (1903–1969) was an Austrian-born architect in Queensland, Australia. A number of his works are listed on the Queensland Heritage Register.

== Early life in Austria ==
Karl Langer was born in Vienna in 1903, where he lived until emigrating to Australia in 1939 with his wife Gertrude. Karl studied architecture in Vienna, most notably in the Master Class run by Peter Behrens, at the Viennese Academy graduating in 1926. During this time Karl worked in the office of Josef Frank, who was to become well known in Swedish modernism, and later in the office of Schmidt and Aichinger. In 1928 he was appointed the architect in charge of Behrens Vienna office, where he designed and supervised important works such as the tobacco factory in Linz, Austria. At this time he also commenced studies in Art History at the University of Vienna, graduating as a Doctor of Philosophy in 1933 with a thesis entitled "Origins and Development of Concrete Construction". In 1935 Karl established his own practice in Vienna.

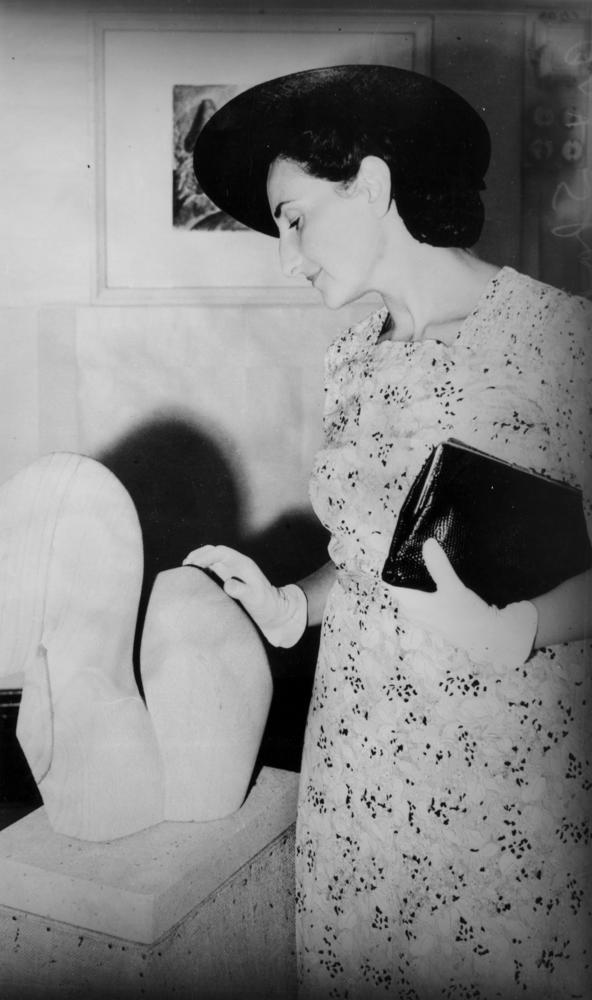
Dr. Gertrude Langer inspecting a local art show, Brisbane, 1940

In 1932 he married a fellow student Gertrude Froeschel. They graduated the following year on the same night, with Doctorates of Philosophy in Art History. In 1938 with the annexation of Austria by the Third Reich, Gertrude, who was Jewish, and Karl left Vienna and traveled via Athens to Australia.

== Career in Australia ==
Karl and Gertrude arrived in Sydney in May 1939 proceeding to Brisbane in July so that Karl could commence work for architects Cook and Kerrison. From the time of their arrival until their deaths the Langers dedicated themselves to a great variety of civic and professional activities. Their combined efforts greatly influenced the development of the arts and design in Queensland, especially through such organisations as the Queensland Art Gallery Society, the Australian Council for the Arts and the Vacation Schools of Creative Art in which they fulfilled key roles over many years.

Karl became well known throughout Australia shortly after his arrival when his appointment to the position of Assistant Town Planner with the Brisbane City Council in 1944 resulted in a Parliamentary Enquiry. The primary cause for complaint was the appointment of an "alien refugee" over a returned soldier. The outcome of this enquiry found that Karl Langer was an individual whose talent and experience clearly distinguished him as the most suitable applicant. He was still prevented from taking up the position, as Queensland Railways, his employer, refused to release him invoking wartime manpower regulations. He remained in the service of the Queensland Railways until 1946 when he left to establish his architectural and planning practice in Brisbane. He worked throughout Australia and was the initiator of many influential urban design ideas such as the site for the Sydney Opera House and the pedestrianization of Queen Street. Karl lectured at the University of Queensland and the Queensland Institute of Technology in design, town planning and landscape architecture. Research carried out when he first arrived in Brisbane pioneered the field of climatic design and resulted in the 1944 publication of an influential booklet called "Subtropical Housing". He was instrumental in establishing, and was the first president of the Brisbane division of the Australian Planning Institute and the Queensland Branch of the Australian Institute of Landscape Architects and was a Fellow of the Royal Australian Institute of Architects.

== Later life ==
Karl Langer died in 1969. His funeral was held in the Chapel of St Peter's Lutheran College, Indooroopilly, which he had designed. He was cremated at the Mount Thompson Crematorium where he had constructed the East Chapel.

Karl Langer's work was featured in the Hot Modernism exhibition at the State Library of Queensland in 2014. State Library of Queensland also holds a large number of his architectural plans.

The University of Queensland Fryer Library holds 89 boxes and around 1800 of Langer's architectural plans.

== Works ==
He was the designer of buildings, including:

- the Main Roads Building at Spring Hill
- St Peter's Lutheran College Chapel at Indooroopilly
- his own home Langer House at St Lucia
- Val Vallis' home in Twigg St, Indooroopilly
- the Four Seasons Hotel
- West's Furniture Showroom at Fortitude Valley (1952)
- extensions to Lennons Hotel, Brisbane (1957)

and worked in the regional centres of Queensland as an architect, town planner and landscape architect, producing these works:

- the assembly hall at Ipswich Girls Grammar School
- St John's Lutheran Church at Bundaberg
- Sugar Research Institute at Mackay
- Lennons Broadbeach Hotel on the Gold Coast
- Lennons Hotel, Toowoomba

He also authored a number of books, including Sub-tropical housing, published in 1944 by the University of Queensland.

== See also ==
- Category:Karl Langer buildings

== Bibliography ==
- Neale, Douglas, "The 'Essentials' of The Sub-Tropical House: An Exegesis of the 'Modernistic' Town Planning Principals', LIMITS: Proceedings of the 21st Annual Conference of the Society of Architectural Historians Australia and New Zealand, ed. H. Edquis and H. Frichot (Melbourne: SAHANZ, 2004), 346–352
- Sinnamon, Ian. 'Langer, Karl (1903–1969)', Australian Dictionary of Biography, National Centre of Biography, Australian National University, published first in hardcopy 2000.
- Sterken, Sven & Lisa Daunt, “From Austria to Australia: Three Lutheran Churches by Karl Langer” in Proceedings of the Society of Architectural Historians, Australia and New Zealand 36, Distance Looks Back, edited by Victoria Jackson Wyatt, Andrew Leach and Lee Stickells (Sydney: SAHANZ, 2020), 350–61.
- van der Plaat, Deborah; Macarthur, John (2021). Karl Langer Modern Architect and Migrant in the Australian Tropics. London: Bloomsbury. ISBN 9781350068117.
- Wilson, Andrew, "Karl Langer's subtropical housing", AAANZ 2008 Annual Conference, 4–6 December, 2008, Brisbane, Australia.
