= Langer House =

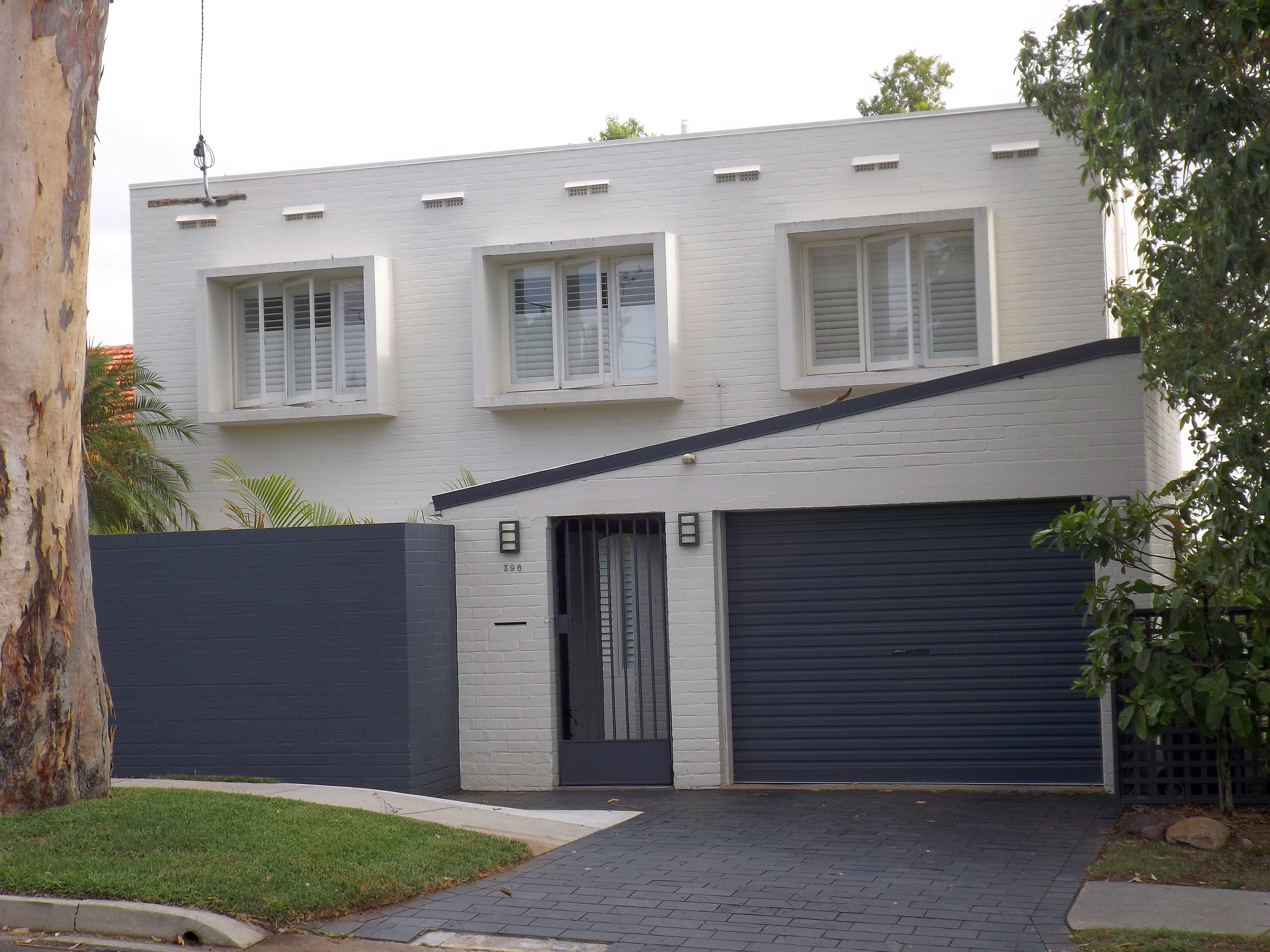
- Structure in 2014

- Location within Queensland Location within Australia
- 27.5017°S 152.9945°E
- Location: 396 Swann Road, St Lucia, City of Brisbane, Queensland, Australia

History
- Design period: 1940s–1960s (post-World War II)
- Built: 1950
- Built for: Karl and Gertrude Langer

Site notes
- Architect: Karl Langer

Queensland Heritage Register
- Official name: Langer House
- Type: state heritage (landscape, built)
- Designated: 21 October 1992
- Reference no.: 600317
- Significant period: 1950s (fabric); 1950s–1980s (historical)
- Significant components: pond/s – garden, garage, wall/s – garden, furniture/fittings, garden – rainforest, roof deck/terrace/promenade, residential accommodation – main house

Langer House is a heritage-listed detached house at 396 Swann Road, St Lucia, City of Brisbane, Queensland, Australia. It was designed by architect Karl Langer as his own home and built in 1950. It was added to the Queensland Heritage Register on 21 October 1992.

== History ==
A vacant block of land on a southern slope in St Lucia was acquired by Karl and Gertrude Langer in 1950 as the site for their new home. The house, a two storeyed brick structure with flat roof designed by Dr Karl Langer was completed in the same year. It remained the home of Karl and Gertrude Langer till their deaths in 1969 and 1984 respectively. Constructed under post war building restrictions, including a floor area limit of 12.5 squares or 13.5 squares if a staircase was incorporated, the design was the product of Karl Langer's research into local climatic issues and his European architectural training. At the rear of the house a rainforest garden was established, a unique undertaking at that time, using indigenous plants such as ferns, native violets and verbenas, cunjevois, walking stick palms, myrtle bushes, ground orchids and rainforest trees. The front garden, a more formal arrangement with a hedge and fish pond was designed in the Japanese style. Timber furniture designed by Karl Langer in the 1930s was used to furnish the house.

Karl Langer was born in Vienna in 1903 where he lived until emigrating to Australia in 1939 with his wife Gertrude. Karl studied architecture in Vienna most notably in the Master Class run by Peter Behrens at the Viennese Academy graduating in 1926. During this time Karl had worked in the office of Josef Frank, who was to become well known in Swedish modernism, and later in the office of Schmidt and Aichinger. In 1928 he was appointed the architect in charge of Behrens Vienna office where he designed and supervised important works such as the tobacco factory in Linz, Austria. At this time he also commenced studies in Art History at the Vienna University graduating as a Doctor of Philosophy in 1933 with a thesis entitled "Origins and Development of Concrete Construction". In 1935 Karl established his own practice in Vienna.

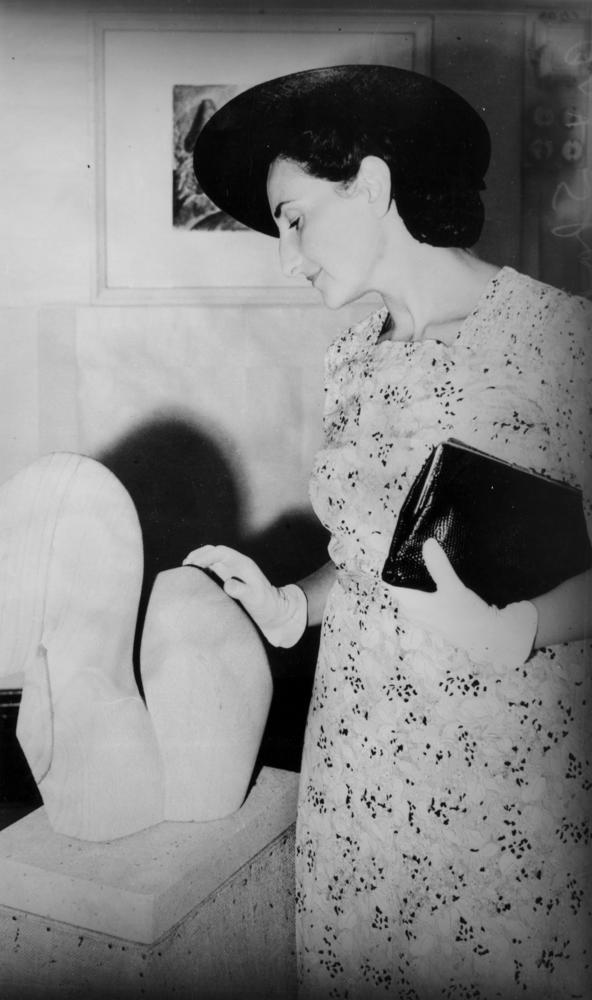
Dr. Gertrude Langer inspecting a local art show, Brisbane, 1940

Gertrude Froeschel was born in Vienna in 1908. She commenced study in the History of Art at Vienna University in 1926 being taught by Professor Josef Strzygowski and later attended lectures by Henri Focillon at the Sorbonne. In 1932 she married a fellow student Karl Langer graduating the following year on the same night as he with a Doctorate of Philosophy in Art History. In 1938 with the annexation of Austria by the Third Reich, Gertrude who was Jewish, and Karl left Vienna and travelled via Athens to Australia.

Karl and Gertrude arrived in Sydney in May 1939 proceeding to Brisbane in July so that Karl could commence work for architects Cook and Kerrison. From the time of their arrival until their deaths the Langers dedicated themselves to a great variety of civic and professional activities. Their combined efforts greatly influenced the development of the arts and design in Queensland especially through such organisations as the Queensland Art Gallery Society, the Australian Council for the Arts and the Vacation Schools of Creative Art in which they fulfilled key roles over many years.

Karl became well known throughout Australia shortly after his arrival when his appointment to the position of Assistant Town Planner with the Brisbane City Council in 1944 resulted in a Parliamentary Enquiry. The primary cause for complaint was the appointment of an "enemy alien" over a returned soldier. The outcome of this enquiry found that Karl Langer was an individual whose talent and experience clearly distinguished him as the most suitable applicant. He was still prevented from taking up the position, as Queensland Railways, his employer, refused to release him invoking wartime manpower regulations. He remained in the service of the Queensland Railways until 1946 when he left to establish his architectural and planning practice in Brisbane. He worked throughout Australia and was the initiator of many influential urban design ideas such as the site for the Sydney Opera House and the pedestrianisation of Queen Street. He was the designer of buildings such as:

- the Main Roads Building at Spring Hill
- Chapel of St Peter's Lutheran College at Indooroopilly
- Lennons Broadbeach Hotel on the Gold Coast

and worked in the regional centres of Queensland as an architect, town planner and landscape architect.

Karl lectured at the University of Queensland and the Queensland Institute of Technology in design, town planning and landscape architecture. Research carried out when he first arrived in Brisbane pioneered the field of climatic design and resulted in 1944 in the publication of an influential booklet called "Subtropical Housing". He was instrumental in establishing, and was the first president of the Brisbane division of the Australian Planning Institute and the Queensland Branch of the Australian Institute of Landscape Architects and was a Fellow of the Royal Australian Institute of Architects.

Gertrude was the art critic for The Courier Mail from 1953 until her death, her last review being published on the day she died, 19 September 1984. She was a foundation member of the International Association of Art Critics and was president of the Association's Australian Division from 1975 to 1978. Through her work with the Gallery Society and her personal donations of art works including drawings by Karl she exerted her influence on the collection of the Queensland Art Gallery.

The house was sold to the present owner after the death of Gertrude Langer. Alterations were subsequently made to the interior and a third level was added.

== Description ==
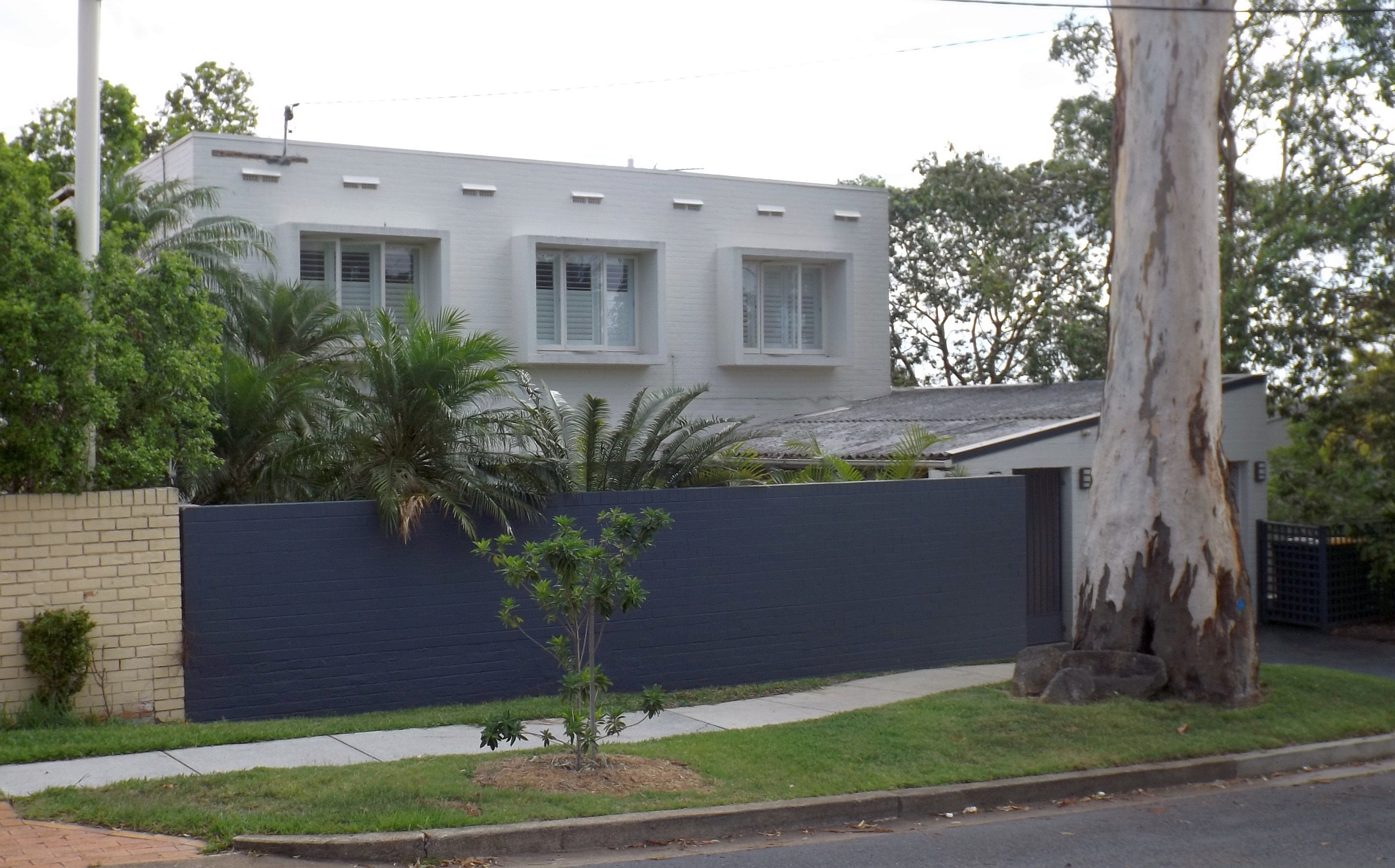
Upper storey, fence and river gum on the footpath, 2014

The house, a three storeyed masonry and timber structure, is located in a well known suburban street on a small rectangular block with a narrow frontage. The site is a south facing slope that falls steeply away from the street. In the space between the house and the footpath is a single storeyed garage, a covered access to the house and a small walled garden containing a fish pond. On the footpath in front of the house stand a very tall river gum. Concealed from the street behind the house is a mature rainforest garden.

Rectangular in plan the house spans across the block with minimal setbacks from side boundaries. The walls are constructed of brickwork which has been rendered and painted, floors are built of timber and skillion roofs are sheeted in corrugated asbestos cement. Openings, primarily timber casement windows, are concentrated in the longer northern and southern elevations facilitating illumination and ventilation of the interior while maintaining privacy. The compact plan of the house ensures the maximum amount of garden space on the small site.

The northern facade rises two storeys above the street. Windows on this elevation are protected by protruding window surrounds on the upper level and a masonry projection that forms an awning over ground level openings. A row of ventilator slots is located above the upper-level windows. The main roof of the house, concealed behind the parapet wall on the northern elevation, has an overhang onto the roof terrace.

Originally built on two levels, the house now has a third level which has been built into the former undercroft space. The front door of the house opens into an entrance hall containing a timber stair which now extends down to the added lower level. This middle level consists of open planned living spaces. Adjacent to the hall is the kitchen which opens onto a former dining area. A long room, originally divided by a timber screen into living area and study, extends across the back of the house with a fireplace on the eastern end. Timber framed double doors open from the hallway into the long room. The internal timber panelling has been removed and the fireplace, originally exposed brickwork, has been bagged and painted.

The upper level consists of two small bedrooms, a bathroom and a large roof terrace which overlooks the densely planted rear garden. The roof terrace is accessed from the landing at the top of the stairs through double timber doors. Built-in cupboards in the principal bedroom have been painted. A wardrobe designed by Karl Langer remains in the smaller bedroom. Doors which opened from the principal bedroom directly onto the terrace have been replaced with windows.

The former Japanese garden has been altered by the increase to the height of the brick garden wall and the removal of the original planting.

== Heritage listing ==
Langer House was listed on the Queensland Heritage Register on 21 October 1992 having satisfied the following criteria.

The place is important in demonstrating the evolution or pattern of Queensland's history.

It is an example of the contribution to Australian culture made by 20th century migrants.

The place is important in demonstrating the principal characteristics of a particular class of cultural places.

The Langer House at St Lucia survives as a fine example of the work of the important and influential architect Karl Langer.

The place is important because of its aesthetic significance.

Through the decorative restraint evident in the facade detailing and composition, and the efficient but spacious planning of the house, Langer introduced to Brisbane aesthetic ideals and social concerns drawn from his experience of European modernism.

The place is important in demonstrating a high degree of creative or technical achievement at a particular period.

It is an inventive and pioneering solution to the problem of domestic design in Brisbane under post-Second World War building restrictions.

Karl Langer's original observations of local climate and landscape led to the incorporation of climatic design principles and an innovative approach to garden design including experimental gardening in the Japanese style and the suburban rainforest garden.

The place has a special association with the life or work of a particular person, group or organisation of importance in Queensland's history.

The home of Gertrude and Karl Langer from 1950 until their deaths, the house and garden are the creation and embodiment of a partnership which had a significant impact on cultural life in Queensland.
