= Jason Langer =

American photographer (born 1967)

- Born: 1967 (age 58–59); Tucson, Arizona
- Education: University of Oregon
- Occupation: Photographer

Jason Langer (born 1967) is an American photographer best known for this psychological and noirish visions of contemporary urban life.

== Early life and training ==
Langer was born in Tucson, Arizona, and grew up in Ashland, Oregon. Langer studied photography at the University of Oregon from 1985 to 1989. After graduation, Langer moved to San Francisco and apprenticed with some of the Bay area's most famous photographers including Ruth Bernhard, Arthur Tress, and Michael Kenna, who became his mentor and lifelong friend. During that time, Langer learned much from Michael Kenna and influences from Kenna remain present throughout Langer's two-decades of photographic work.

== Style ==
Langer shoots using film, meaning that he does not know exactly what photographs he has until the film is developed. He photographs in black and white and prefers to photograph at night. He avoids photographing human faces, which increases the mystery of his works.

== Galleries ==
Langer is represented by galleries in Europe and North America: Michael Shapiro (New York and East Coast), Esther Woerdehoff (Paris), and Charles A. Hartman, Fine Art (Portland, OR).

== Photobooks ==
- Twenty Years, Radius, 2015.
- Possession, Nazraeli Press, 2013.
- Secret City, Nazraeli Press, 2006.

== Awards ==
- The Wood Institute Grant, 2012.
- Top Prize, Madrid Foto 2012.
- Fotofusion Rising Star Award, Palm Beach Photographic Centre 2006.
