= Salomon Z. Langer =

Argentine pharmacologist

Salomon Zender Langer
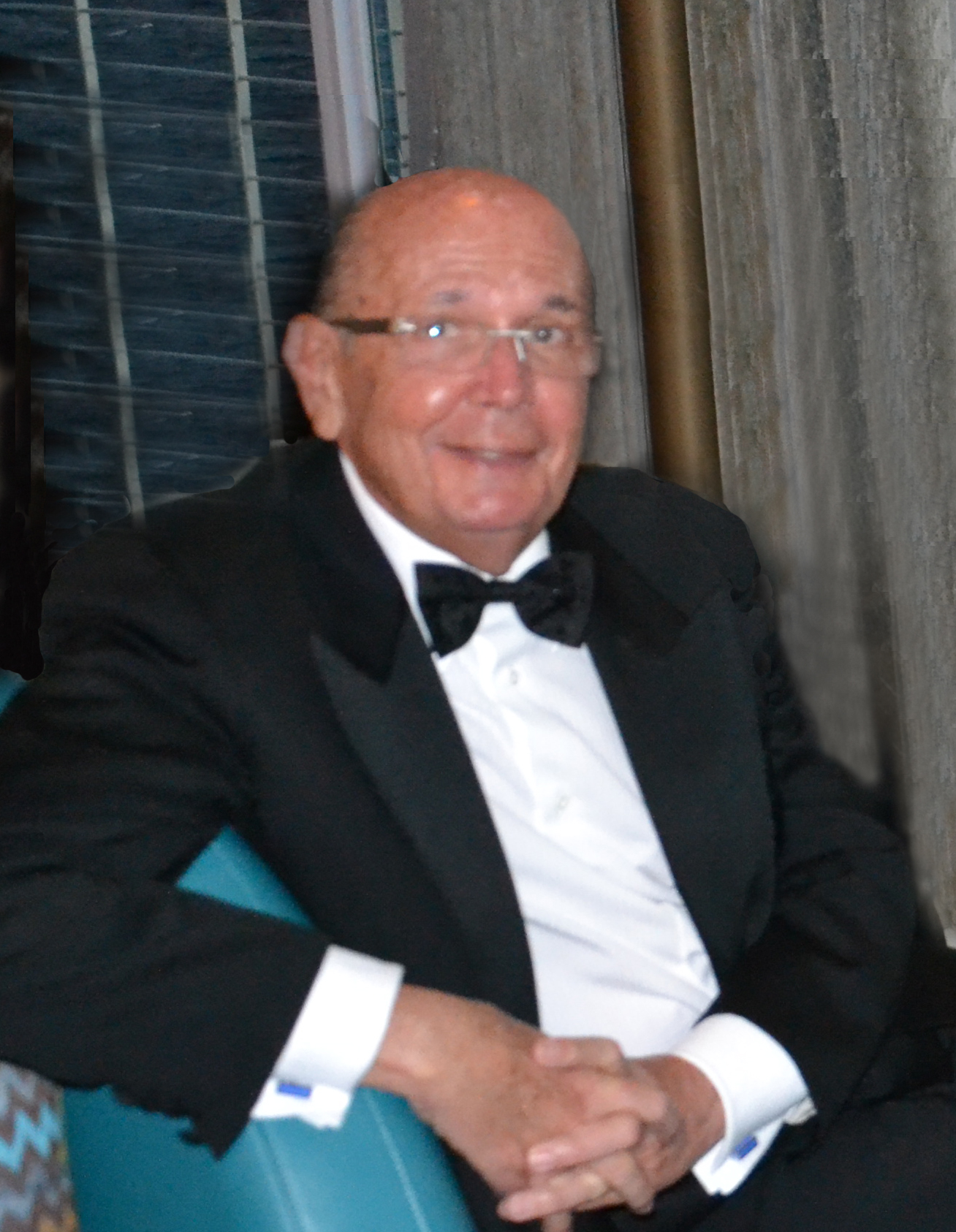
- Born: 1936 (age 89–90); Buenos Aires, Argentina
- Education: University of Buenos Aires
- Scientific career
- Fields: Pharmacology
- Workplaces: Harvard University; University of Cambridge; Wellcome Research Laboratories

Salomon Zender Langer (born 1936) is an Argentine pharmacologist whose research has focused on neurotransmission, adrenergic receptors and drug discovery. His research included work on presynaptic receptors involved in the regulation of neurotransmitter release.

== Early life and education ==
Langer was born in Buenos Aires, Argentina, in 1936. He graduated from the School of Medicine at the University of Buenos Aires in 1960.

== Career ==
In 1962 he received a Rockefeller Foundation Fellowship to continue his studies at Tulane University, New Orleans, and his fellowship was prolonged to join the Department of Pharmacology at Harvard University from 1963 until the end of 1966. His research was on the mechanisms involving denervation supersensitivity. with Ullrich Trendelenburg.

From 1966 to 1967 he received a fellowship from the Heymans Institute, Ghent, Belgium.

From 1967 to 1969, Langer was a senior research fellow at the Institute of Animal Physiology in Cambridge, where he worked with Marthe Vogt on norepinephrine uptake and the regulation of neurotransmitter release. He also worked with Leslie Iversen at the Department of Pharmacology, Cambridge University.

In 1969, he returned to Argentina where he was appointed Director of the Institute for Pharmacological Research. His work led to the discovery of the presynaptic inhibitory Alpha-adrenoceptors on noradrenergic nerve terminals and their role in the modulation of the NE release during nerve stimulation

During the 1970s, Langer investigated presynaptic alpha-adrenoceptors involved in the regulation of noradrenaline release and contributed to the pharmacological distinction between alpha-1 and alpha-2 adrenoceptors.

Langer also studied cotransmission involving norepinephrine and adenosine triphosphate (ATP).

In 1976, Langer became Head of the Department of Pharmacology at the Wellcome Research Laboratories in Beckenham, Kent, UK.

In 1977, Langer joined Synthélabo Research in Paris as director of biology, later becoming research director and vice-president. His research there included work on high-affinity binding sites associated with the serotonin transporter and on presynaptic autoreceptors involved in neurotransmitter release.

Throughout the 1980s Langer continued his work on presynaptic autoreceptors regulating norepinephrine, dopamine and serotonin (5-HT) release and reported the interactions in neurotransmission between the neuronal transporter and the corresponding autoreceptor.

In 1984 he was listed among the 250 most-cited scientific primary authors according to the ISI (Institute for Scientific Information) Citation Index

From 2000 to 2007, Langer was senior vice-president of molecular biology and drug discovery at Compugen. In 2014, he founded Synaptic Pharma, a biotechnology company developing eliprodil.

Langer is among the highly cited researchers (ISI) in Pharmacology since 1981.

== Awards and prizes ==
- 1960: Gold medal to the best graduate at the Medical School, University of Buenos Aires, Argentina
- 1962: School of Medicine Award given to the best doctoral thesis of the year: « Audiogenic seizures », University of Buenos Aires, Argentina
- 1962: Rockefeller Foundation Fellowship
- 1976: Guggenheim Fellowship for research in cardiovascular pharmacology
- 1977: Gaddum Memorial Lecture Award by the British Pharmacological Society
- 1980: G.E. Brown Memorial Lecture of the American Heart Association
- 1981:First International Prize of the Anna-Monika Foundation (Dortmund, West Germany) for research in the field of endogenous depression.
- 1986: Pythagoras Prize in Pharmacology. Mediterranea University of Reggio Calabria, Calabria, Italy.
- 1991:Otto Krayer Award in Pharmacology, presented by ASPET (American Society of Pharmacology and Experimental Therapeutics)
- 1991: Ciba Award in Hypertension, presented by the Council for High Blood Pressure of the American Heart Association, USA.
- 1993: Eli Lilly Award in Neuroscience from the European College of Neuropsychopharmacology(ECNP).
- 1999: Lieber Prize in Schizophrenia presented by the National Alliance for Research on Schizophrenia and Depression (NARSAD), USA.
- 2000: ASPET Award of the American Society for Pharmacology and Experimental Therapeutics.
- 2002: Julius Axelrod Award Medal for research in the field of Catecholamines (ASPET).
- 2009: Mark Nickerson Memorial Lecture at McGill University, Montreal, Quebec, Canada.
- 2009:Inaugural Norman Weiner Memorial Award by the International College of Neurophychopharmacology (CINP)
- 2010: Pioneers in Psychopharmacology Award by the CINP

== Honors and other special scientific recognitions ==
- 1972-1974 Vice-President of the Latin American Society of Pharmacology
- 1974-1976 President of the Latin American Society of Pharmacology
- 1975-1977 President of the Argentine Society of Experimental Pharmacology
- 1975-1980 Member of the World Health Organization Expert Advisory Panel on drug evaluation
- 1984 ISI citation index: Dr Langer was listed among the 250 most-cited scientific primary authors
- 1989 to 1992 President of the European College of Neuropsychopharmacology (ECNP)
- 1991 to 1998 Vice-President of the International College of Neuropsychopharmacology (CINP)
- 1991 to 1997 Member of the Executive Committee of the World Federation of Societies of Biological Psychiatry (WFSBP)
- 1999 Honorary Professor, University of Buenos Aires, Argentina
- Honorary member of the National Academy of Medicine, Buenos Aires, Argentina
- 2002 to 2006 Treasurer and Member of the Executive Committee of IUPHAR(International Union of Basic and Clinical Pharmacology)
- 2006 to 2010 First Vice-President of IUPHAR

== Major scientific discoveries ==
- The first extensive and rigorous evidence of co-transmission of neurotransmitters (norepinephrine and ATP) in the 1970s, demonstrating that neurons can release more than one type of neurotransmitter simultaneously.
- The identification and description of presynaptic auto-receptors for several neurotransmitters, including dopamine, serotonin, acetylcholine, GABA and glutamate. These auto-receptors regulate neurotransmitter release and are critical in synaptic transmission control.
- The discovery of a specific, high-affinity binding site for 3H-imipramine and later 3H-paroxetine associated with serotonin transporter in brain and blood platelets, which played a key role in serotonin transporter purification for cloning and expression
- Development and discovery of several important pharmacological compounds, including Diltiazem (a calcium antagonist used for coronary insufficiency), Betaxolol (a selective beta-1 antagonist used for hypertension and glaucoma), Alfusozin (an alpha-1 adrenergic blocker primarily used to treat symptoms of benign prostatic hyperplasia), Zolpidem (a selective agonist for benzodiazepine receptors used for insomnia), and Mizolastine (a histamine H-1 receptor antagonist used for allergic diseases).
- Contributions to the development of the atypical antipsychotic Aripiprazole
- Research advancing drug discovery for major depression and Alzheimer’s disease, including founding Synaptic Pharma Ltd in 2014.

These discoveries significantly advanced the understanding of neurotransmission mechanisms, receptor pharmacology, and facilitated the development of key drugs in cardiovascular, neurological, psychiatric and allergic disease therapies.
