= Gertrude Langer =

Austrian-born Australian art critic

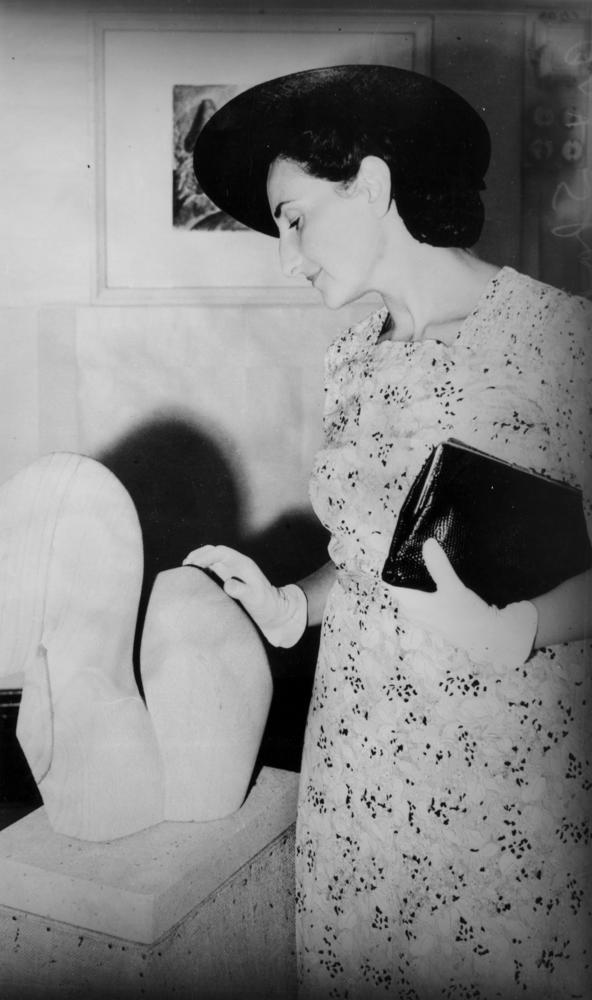
Dr. Gertrude Langer inspecting a local art show, Brisbane, 1940

Gertrude Langer OBE (née Froeschel) (1908–1984) was an Austrian-born art critic in Brisbane, Queensland, Australia. She was prominent in the Queensland Art Gallery and other arts organisations.

== Life in Austria ==
Gertrude Froeschel was born in Vienna, Austria in 1908. She commenced study in the History of Art at Vienna University in 1926 being taught by Professor Josef Strzygowski and later attended lectures by Henri Focillon at the Sorbonne. In 1932 she married a fellow student Karl Langer graduating the following year on the same night as he with a Doctorate of Philosophy in Art History. In 1938 before the annexation of Austria by the Third Reich, Gertrude who was Jewish, and Karl left Vienna and travelled via Athens to Australia.

== Life in Australia ==
Karl and Gertrude arrived in Sydney in May 1939 proceeding to Brisbane in July so that Karl could commence work for architects Cook and Kerrison. From the time of their arrival until their deaths the Langers dedicated themselves to a great variety of civic and professional activities. Their combined efforts greatly influenced the development of the arts and design in Queensland especially through such organisations as the Queensland Art Gallery Society, the Australian Council for the Arts and the Vacation Schools of Creative Art in which they fulfilled key roles over many years.

As one of the earliest of Australia's women newspaper art critics, Gertrude wrote for The Courier Mail from 1953 until her last review, published on the day she died, 19 September 1984. She was a foundation member of the International Association of Art Critics and was president of the Association's Australian Division from 1975 to 1978. Through her work with the Gallery Society and her personal donations of art works including drawings by Karl she exerted her influence on the collection of the Queensland Art Gallery.

Their home, Langer House, in St Lucia was designed by her husband Karl. The house was sold after the death of Gertrude Langer in 1984. It is listed on the Queensland Heritage Register.

== Honours ==
She was made an Officer of the Order of the British Empire by The Queen on 1 January 1968 for her services as President of the Arts Council of Queensland.

== Works ==
Her works included a book of poems for her late husband Karl:

- Langer, Gertrude; Langer Memorial Committee (1971), Love transcends death : poems for my beloved Karl, Langer Memorial Committee (published 1987), ISBN 978-0-7316-0241-4
