= Planning Institute Australia =

Peak national body for town planning and planning profession

Planning Institute of Australia
- Formation: 1951
- Type: Professional Body
- Purpose: Representing the urban and regional planning profession in Australia.
- Headquarters: Unit 16, Level 3, Engineering House, 11 National Circuit, Barton ACT 2600
- Members: 5,872 (2023/24)
- President: Emma Riley RPIA Fellow
- Revenue: $7.3m (AUD) (2023/24)
- Website: https://www.planning.org.au/

Planning Institute of Australia (PIA) is a national body representing town planning and the planning profession across Australia. PIA represents approximately 6000 members nationally and internationally. It is governed by a National Board of Directors and managed by a professional administration. It is a member-based organisation with its management complemented by volunteers, who support and contribute to its activities on various levels.

PIA runs a number of events at both the National and State/Territory levels, including an annual National Congress, an Annual State Conference in most States/Territories, professional development seminars, and a number of social occasions. PIA also presents State and National Awards for Planning Excellence to recognise and publicise outstanding achievements in planning and design, and has a code of professional conduct to which all members are required to adhere.

PIA is closely aligned with a global network of other planning professional bodies throughout the world including the American Planning Association (APA) and Royal Town Planning Institute.

PIA also publishes Australian Planner, a peer-reviewed journal for the planning profession in Australia and the Pacific Region.

The Planning Institute of Australia holds an annual National Congress on a rotational basis between the capital cities.

== Background ==
The origin of the Planning Institute was in early volunteer-based Australian town planning associations comprising a mixture of design professionals (architects, engineers and surveyors) and interested individuals. This included the Town Planning Association of NSW in 1913, and the Western Australian Town Planning Association in 1916.

In the 1930s a growing desire on the part of the qualified professionals to create advocacy groups modelled after the British Town and Country Planning Institute led to the formation of various state and City-based institutes. In their early years there was sometimes conflict between the institutes and volunteer-based associations.

The first of these bodies was the Town Planning Institute of Western Australia, formed by Harold Boas in 1931 and lasting only 4 years.

By 1950, various Australian professional associations representing town planners had consolidated into the Town Planning Institute of Australia (representing Victoria, Western Australia and Tasmania), the Town Planning Institute of South Australia and the NSW-based Town and Country Planning Institute of Australia. In January 1951, all three institutes met in Melbourne and formally agreed to amalgamate as the Regional and Town Planning Institute. On 11 August 1951, the new institute was constituted at a meeting in Canberra, with Arthur Winston as the first president. This organisation became the only national organisation representing qualified urban and regional planners and other related disciplines in Australia.

It later became the Royal Australian Planning Institute until 2002, when the current name was adopted.

== Policies ==
=== National settlement strategy ===
The PIA has advocated for a settlement strategy for many years and says Australia needs a national plan to manage the population boom.

In April 2026, the PIA called on the Australian government to implement a National Plan for Australia's Growth with their 'Growing Well' report. The report recommended management of Australia's megaregions, connection of city regions with high-speed rail, creation of new towns (like Canberra, Springfield or Bradfield), regional growth and reducing exposure to natural hazards. The report urged discussion about whether Australia should build mega cities or whether it should build satellite cities.

The campaign received wide media coverage, linking to a Macrobusiness article stating the concerns were well justified as "policymakers must cut immigration to stabilise the population", to 2GB recording of Leith Van Onselen backing the strategy, a Courier-Mail article, and a book recommendation for Bolleter and Freestone's Planning for a Continent of Cities: Long range scenarios for Australian urbanisation which looks at scenarios and community preferences for Australian urban settlement.

A national settlement plan would redirect population growth away from capitals to satellite and regional cities. In The Age, Julian Bolleter said Australia is at a tipping point where decentralisation may have more political and economic benefits than a sprawling cities planning approach. The Victorian president of the PIA is sympathetic to the idea of decentralisation however believes "turning the ship around" is a big ask. Julianne Schultz described the paper as "outstanding", stating a more serious discussion of decentralization was required due to the urban workplace impact of artificial intelligence.

In 2017, the PIA recommended a scenario analysis of many regional cities verses two megacities.

== Surveys ==
In 2017, a survey of PIA members found 12% of PIA members believed major cities have a greater capacity to accommodate growth and opposed higher regional growth. 0% of surveyed PIA members opposed regional city growth prioritisation on the basis it would "reduce the productivity advantages of major cities as job / knowledge agglomerations".

In 2026, a live panel session at PIA Congress 2026, featuring Andrea Breen, Chris O’Dell, John Duguid, and Corrie McLeod, discussed the 3 polling results of the Myth vs Reality in Planning 2026 survey. Of 123 planning professionals across Australia and New Zealand surveyed, 96% of planners said planning is not the primary bottleneck to the housing crisis, 94% said poor planning systems were contributing to burnout, and 54% of planners believed AI would transform planning.

== Events ==
The PIA runs a number of events, such as the annual Planning Congress in Canberra., Rural, Regional and Remote Conference (RRR) and state-based conferences.

== University affiliation ==
The institute works closely Australian universities providing accreditation to town planning courses and programs. The current list of accredited programs includes:

ACT

- University of Canberra (Bachelor of Planning Accreditation: to 2012)
- University of Canberra (Master of Urban and Regional Planning Accreditation: to 2014)

New South Wales

- University of Sydney
- University of New South Wales
- University of Technology, Sydney
- Macquarie University
- University of New England
- Charles Sturt University
- University of Western Sydney

Northern Territory

- Northern Territory University

Queensland

- University of Queensland
- Griffith University
- Queensland University of Technology
- James Cook University
- University of Sunshine Coast
- Bond University

South Australia

- University of Adelaide
- University of South Australia – Master of Urban and Regional Planning
- Flinders University

Tasmania

- University of Tasmania

Western Australia

- Curtin University
- University of Western Australia

Victoria

- RMIT University
- University of Melbourne (Masters only)

== See also ==
- Urban planning in Australia
