= Conrad Gargett =

Australian architecture and design practice

Practice information
- Firm type: Architecture; Landscape architecture; Interior design; Urban design
- Founders: Henry Wallace Atkinson; Charles McLay (1907); Arnold Conrad (1918); Lange Powell (1926); Sydney Ancher (1946); Bryce Mortlock (1946); Ken Woolley (1946); Robert Riddel (1982)
- Founded: 1890; 136 years ago
- Location: Brisbane, Sydney, Melbourne, Gold Coast, Townsville, Addis Ababa

Website
- https://architectus.com.au/

Conrad Gargett was an Australian architecture and design practice founded in Brisbane in 1890, one of Queensland's earliest architectural firms. The practice operated out of studios in Brisbane, Sydney, Melbourne, Gold Coast, Townsville and Addis Ababa. In 2023, it merged with Australian architecture firm, Architectus.

== Establishment ==
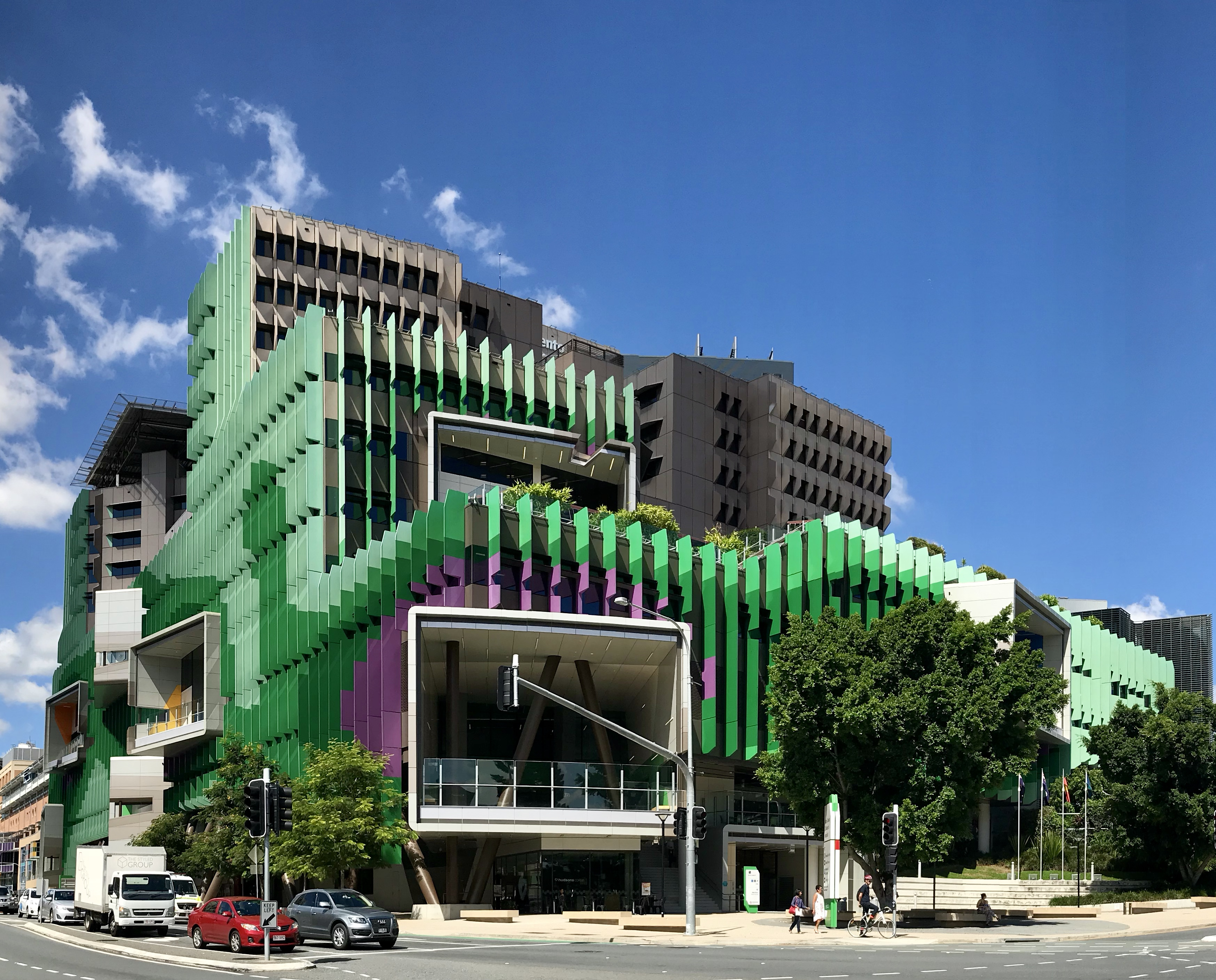
Queensland Children's Hospital designed with Lyons, South Brisbane

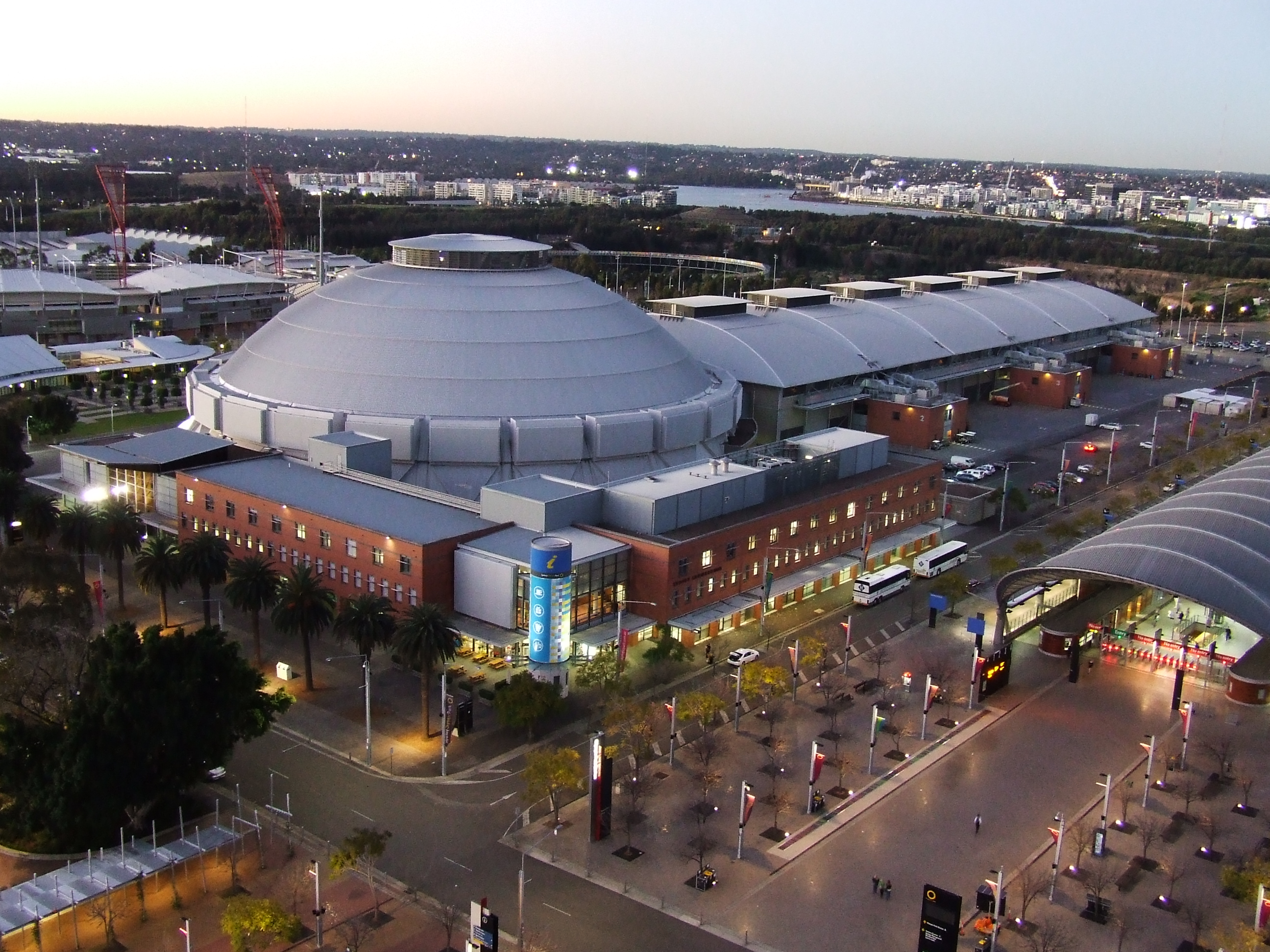
Royal Agricultural Showground Exhibition Halls, Sydney

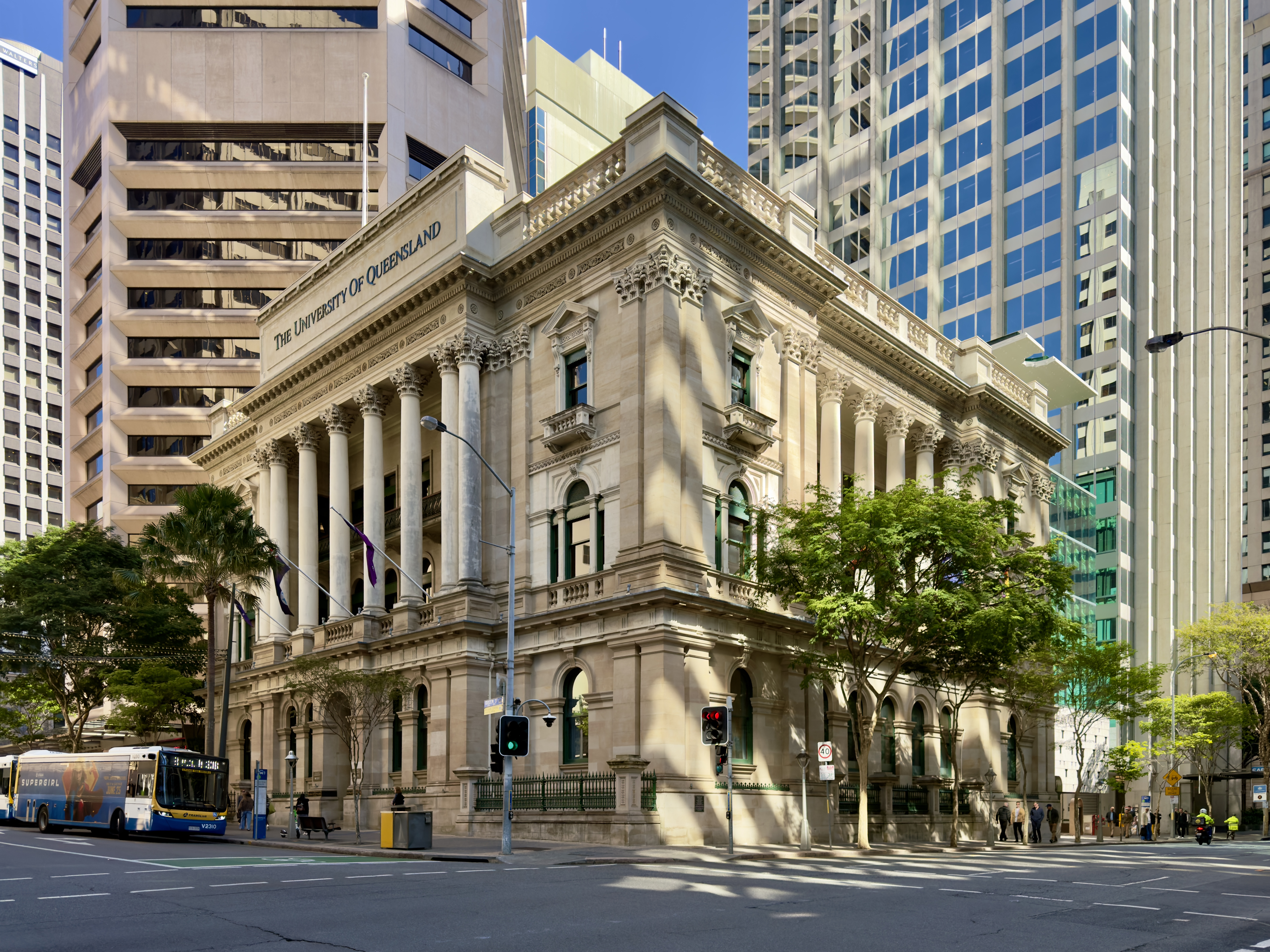
The former Queensland National Bank at 308 Queen Street, completed in association with Donovan Hill

Conrad Gargett Architecture was established as HW Atkinson in 1890 by Henry Wallace Atkinson with the winning design for the new Brisbane Head Fire Station. Charles McLay joined Atkinson to form the partnership HW Atkinson & Chas McLay in 1907. The practice subsequently assumed the position of Diocesan Architect to the Anglican Church, designing several schools and churches in South East Queensland. Following the death of McLay in 1918, the practice was renamed Atkinson & Conrad when Arnold Conrad became a partner. The new firm was noted for its use of the distinctive Spanish Mission style in many of its projects. The practice was also appointed to the position of Hospital Architect by various hospital boards and played a large role in the design of hospitals in Queensland between 1920–80, including extensive projects at the Royal Brisbane Hospital, South Brisbane Auxiliary Hospital (now Princess Alexandra Hospital), Prince Charles Hospital and Gold Coast Hospital. Following their appointment in 1926 as architects to the Brisbane and South Coast Hospital Board, the practice took on a new partner Lange Leopold Powell becoming Atkinson, Powell & Conrad.

During the post-war era, the firm now called AH Conrad & TBF Gargett (Thomas Brenan Femister Gargett having become a partner) became a prominent designer of commercial office towers in the Brisbane CBD. Most notable of these were the SGIO Building including the SGIO Theatre (now Suncorp Metway Plaza) and head offices for three of the big four banks. The MLC building, designed in 1955 with Bates Smart, was one of the first commercial office buildings to be built in the undecorated, modern style in Brisbane.

In 2017, a book titled Conrad Gargett was published detailing the history of the firm between 1890 and 2015. The book was edited by Robert Riddel, and attempts to provide a broader historical and architectural context to the various phases in which the practice has operated.

== Growth ==
Conrad Gargett formed after Conrad Gargett Architecture undertook a series of mergers with Riddel Architecture (2012) and Ancher Mortlock Woolley (2013). The contemporary firm is a multi-disciplinary practice, which specialises in health, education, heritage and defence.

Riddel Architecture was established in 1982 by Robert Riddel. The Brisbane-based practice focused on heritage, conservation and adaptive reuse projects. Notable works by the firm include the restoration and adaptive re-use of Brisbane's Customs House, the former Wests Furniture Showroom and the former Queensland National Bank at 308 Queen Street (in association with Donovan Hill).

Ancher Mortlock Woolley, initially called Ancher Mortlock & Murray, was established in 1946 by Sydney Ancher, Bryce Mortlock and Stuart Murray. The Sydney-based practice was later joined by Ken Woolley in 1964. The practice designed modern structures, winning both the Sir Zelman Cowen Award for Public Architecture and the Robin Boyd Award for Residential Architecture. Notable projects by the practice include Town Hall House and Sydney Square (1977) and more recently, the Royal Agricultural Showground Exhibition Halls and restoration of the State Library of Victoria.

As at 2022, Conrad Gargett employed over 200 staff and worked in varying scales and sectors including commercial, community and civic, defence, education and research, health, heritage, infrastructure, justice, residential, retail and Hospitality, seniors living, sport and leisure, transport, urban design and masterplanning, and workplace and interior design.

On 5 April 2023, it was announced that Conrad Gargett would merge with another large Australian practice Architectus, to create one of Australia's largest architecture firms, with over 700 employees.

== Notable works ==
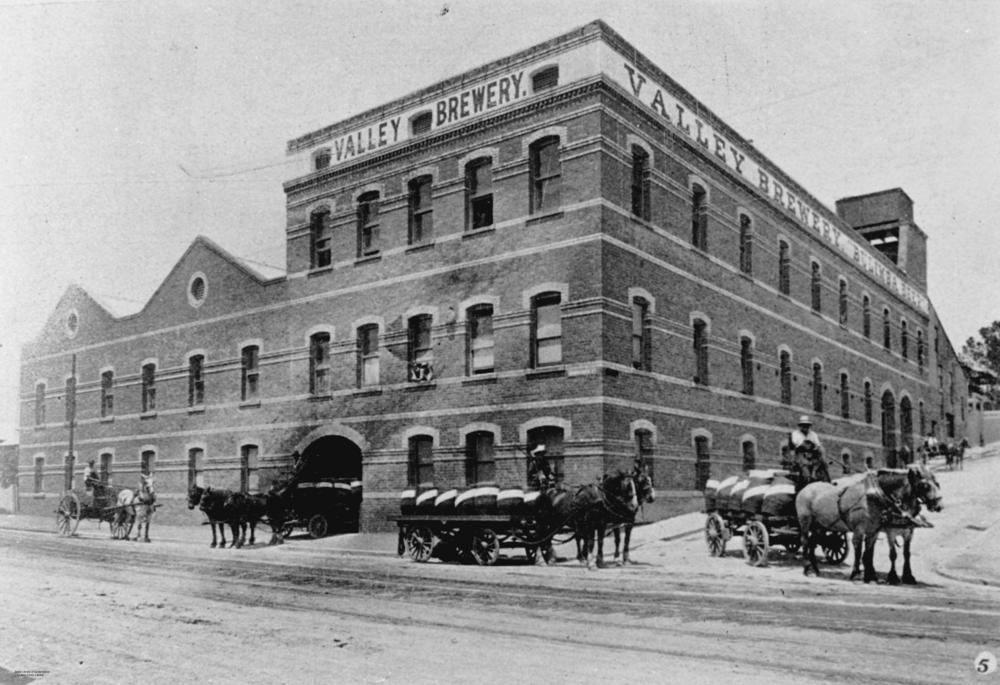
Queensland Brewery in Fortitude Valley, Brisbane

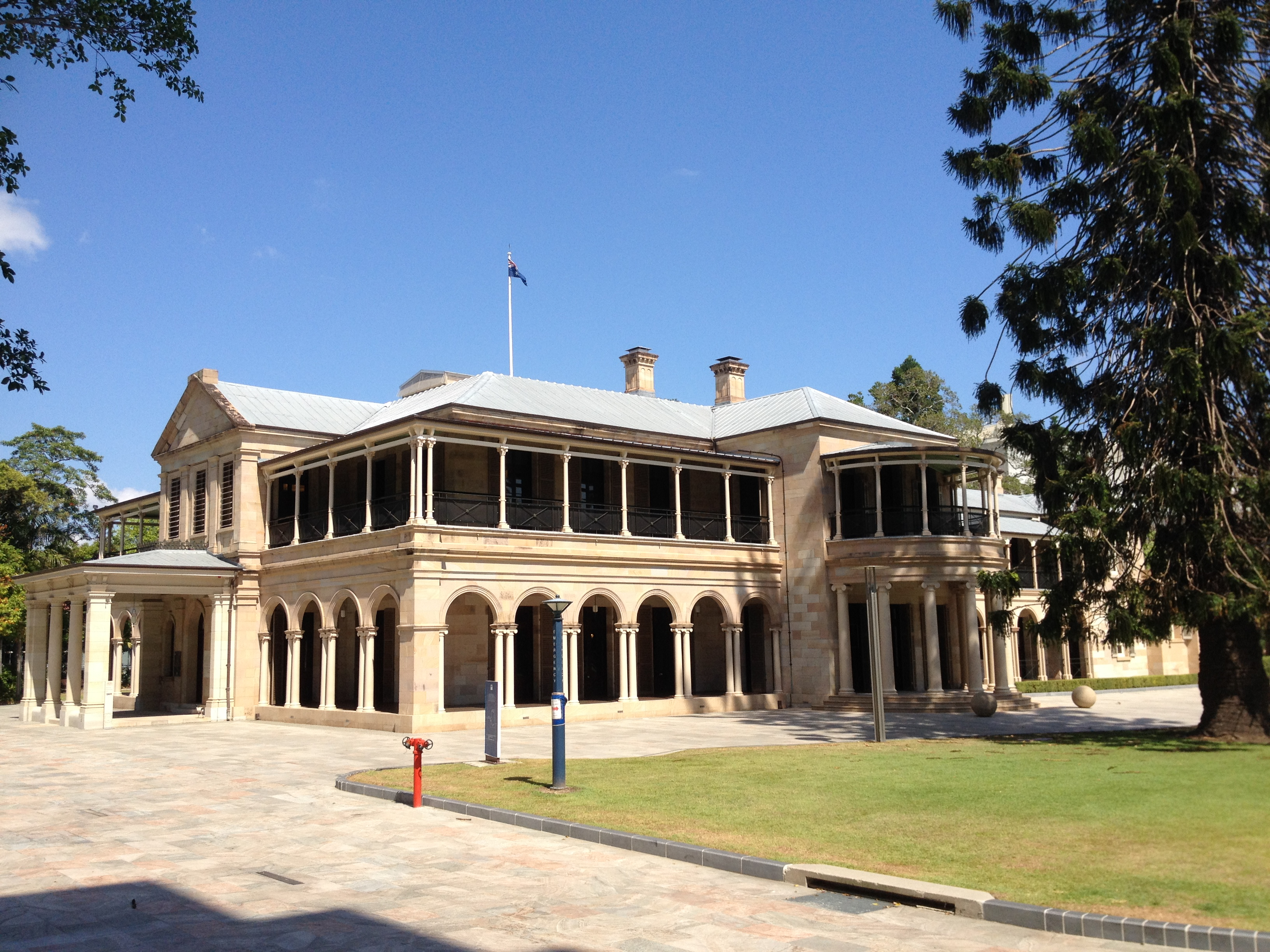
Old Government House, Gardens Point

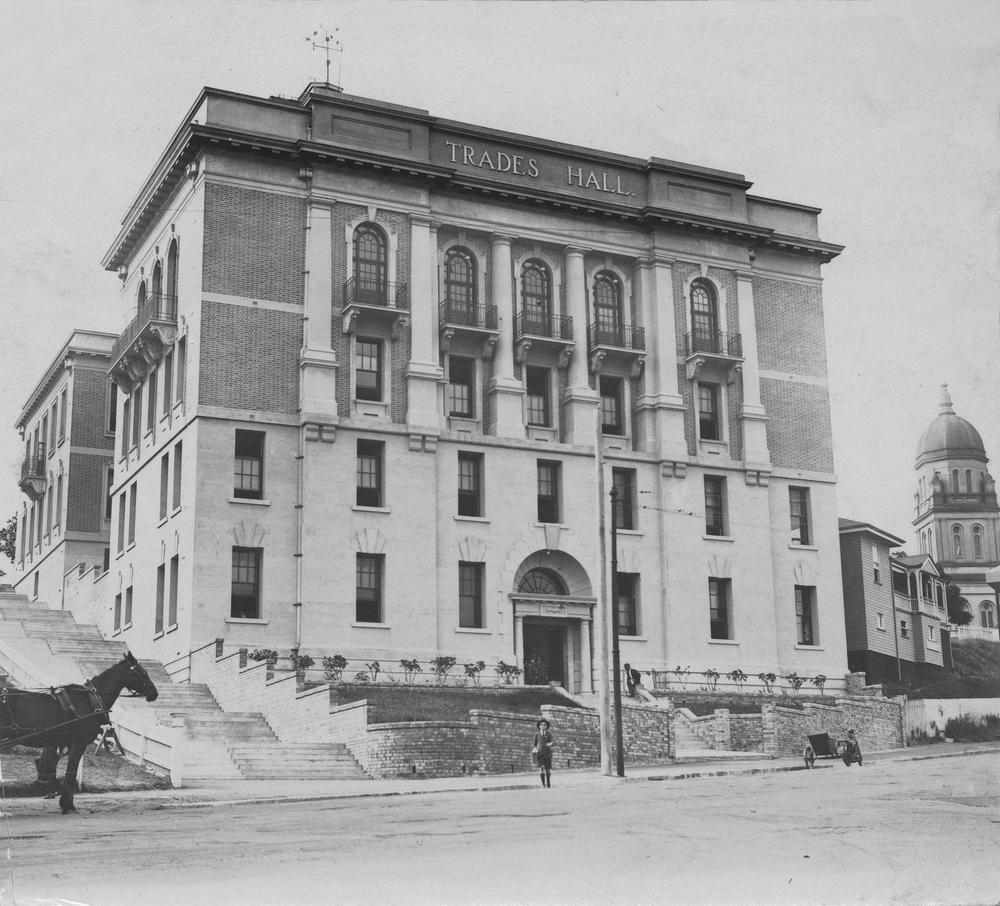
Trades and Labour Hall, Brisbane (now demolished)

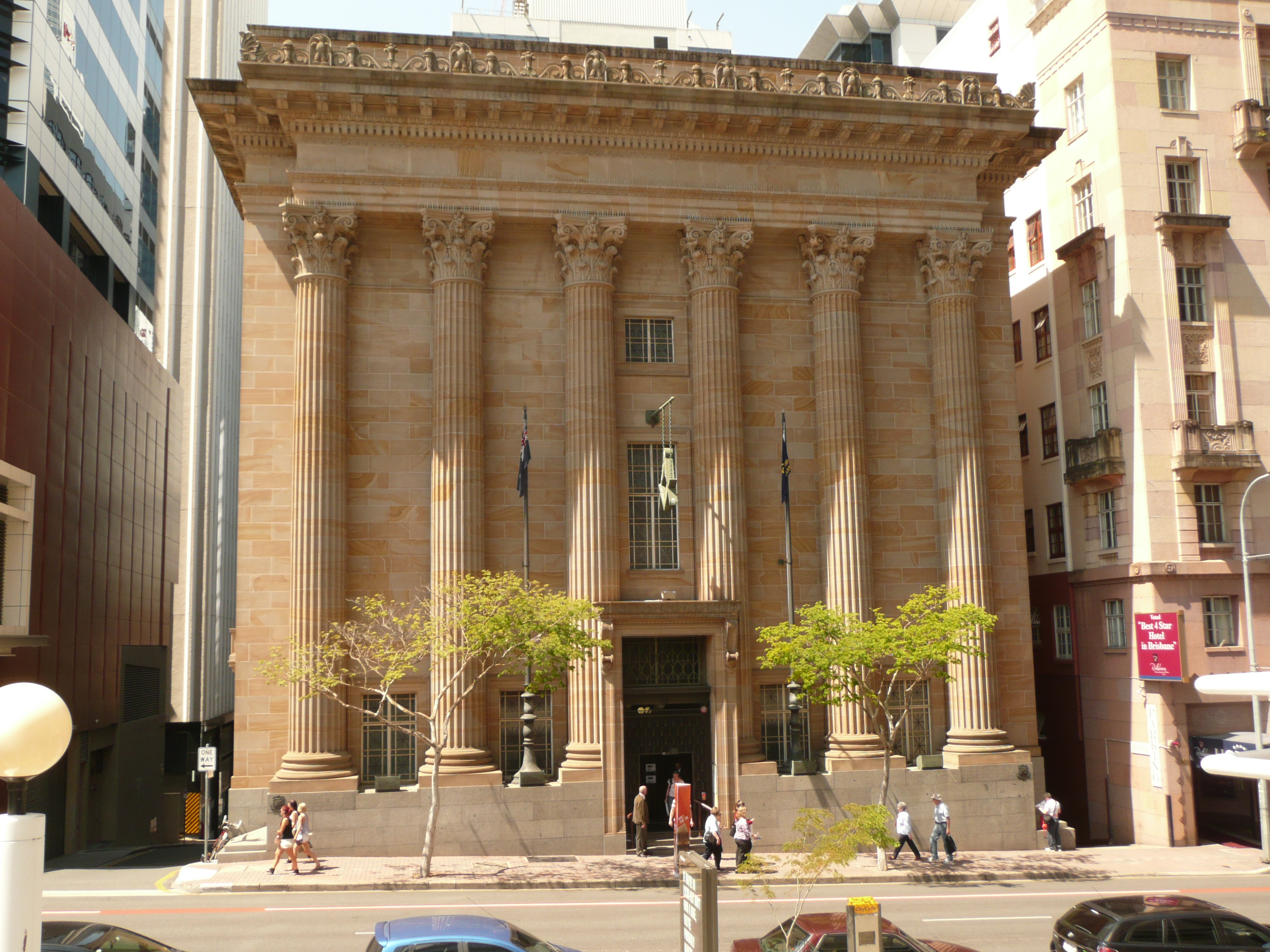
Masonic Temple, Brisbane (Designed by Lange Powell)

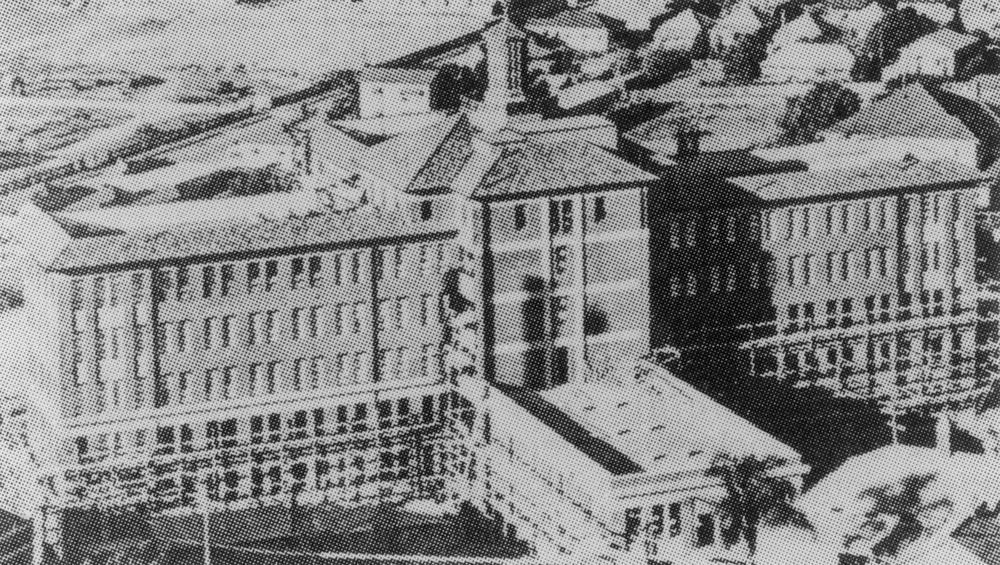
Royal Women's Hospital in Brisbane at the time of its opening, 1938

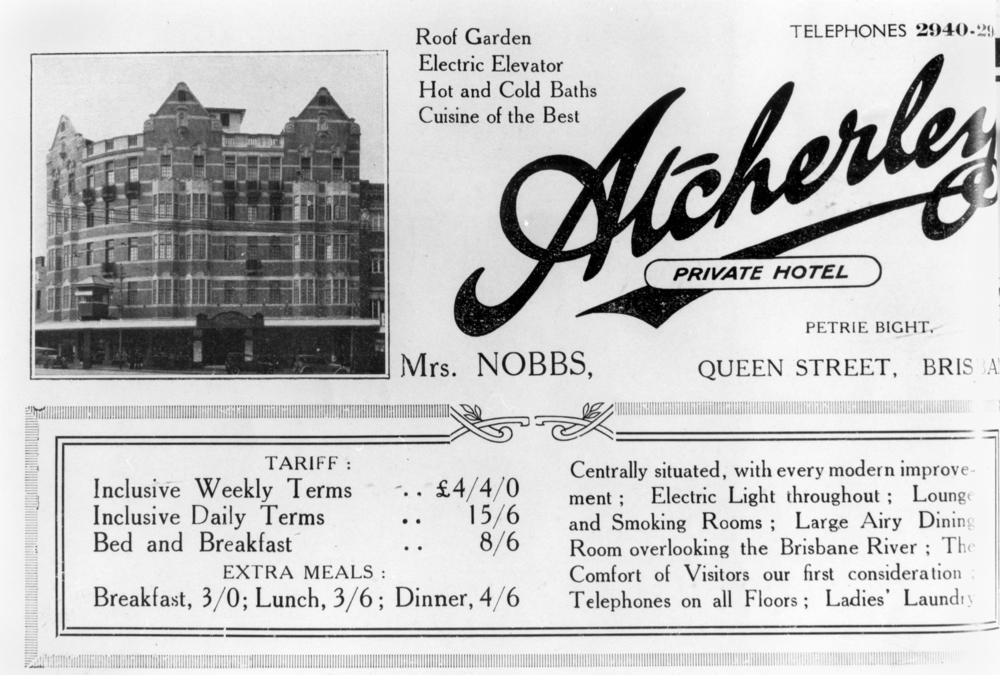
Advertisement for the Atcherley Private Hotel, Adelaide Street

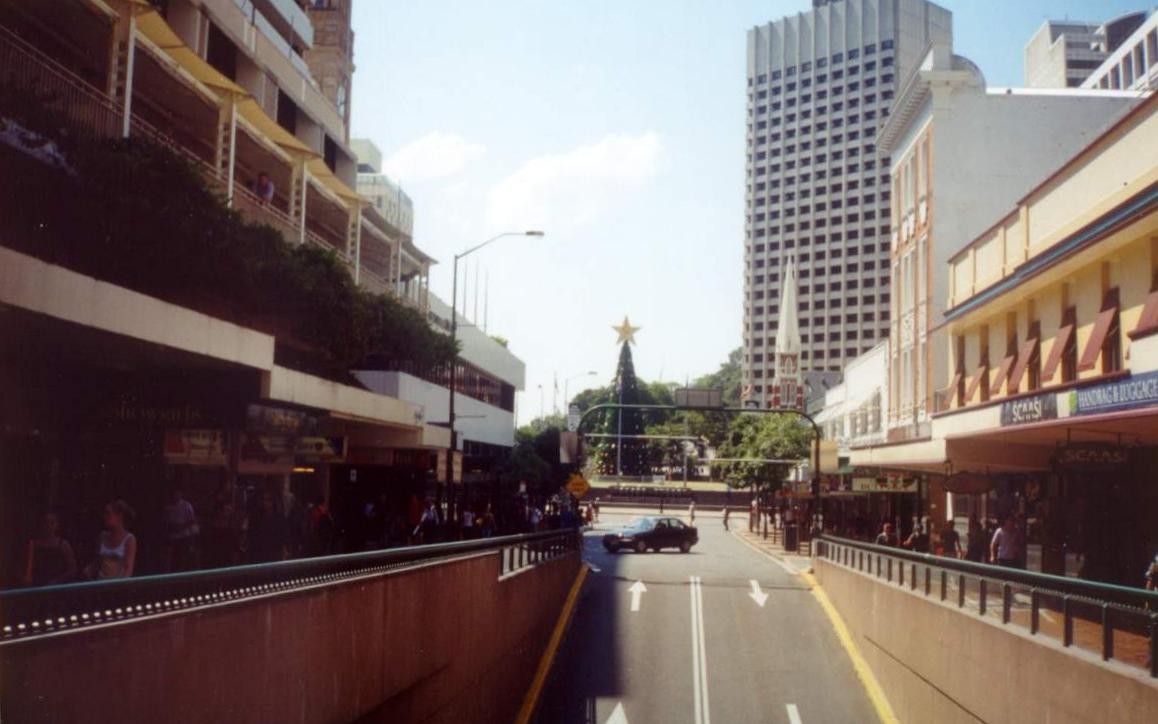
SGIO Building (now Suncorp Plaza) viewed from Albert street across King George Square

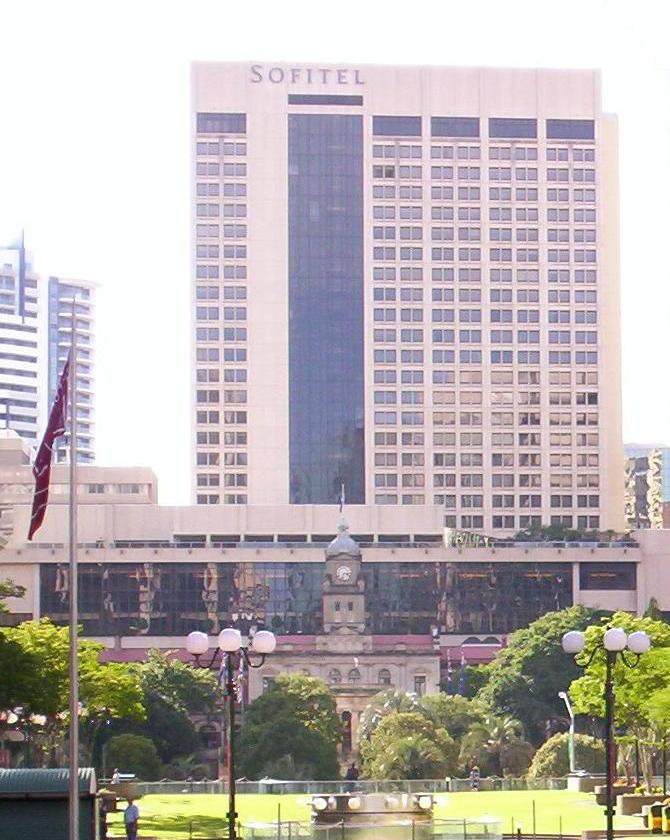
Sheraton Hotel (now Sofitel) over Central Station, Brisbane

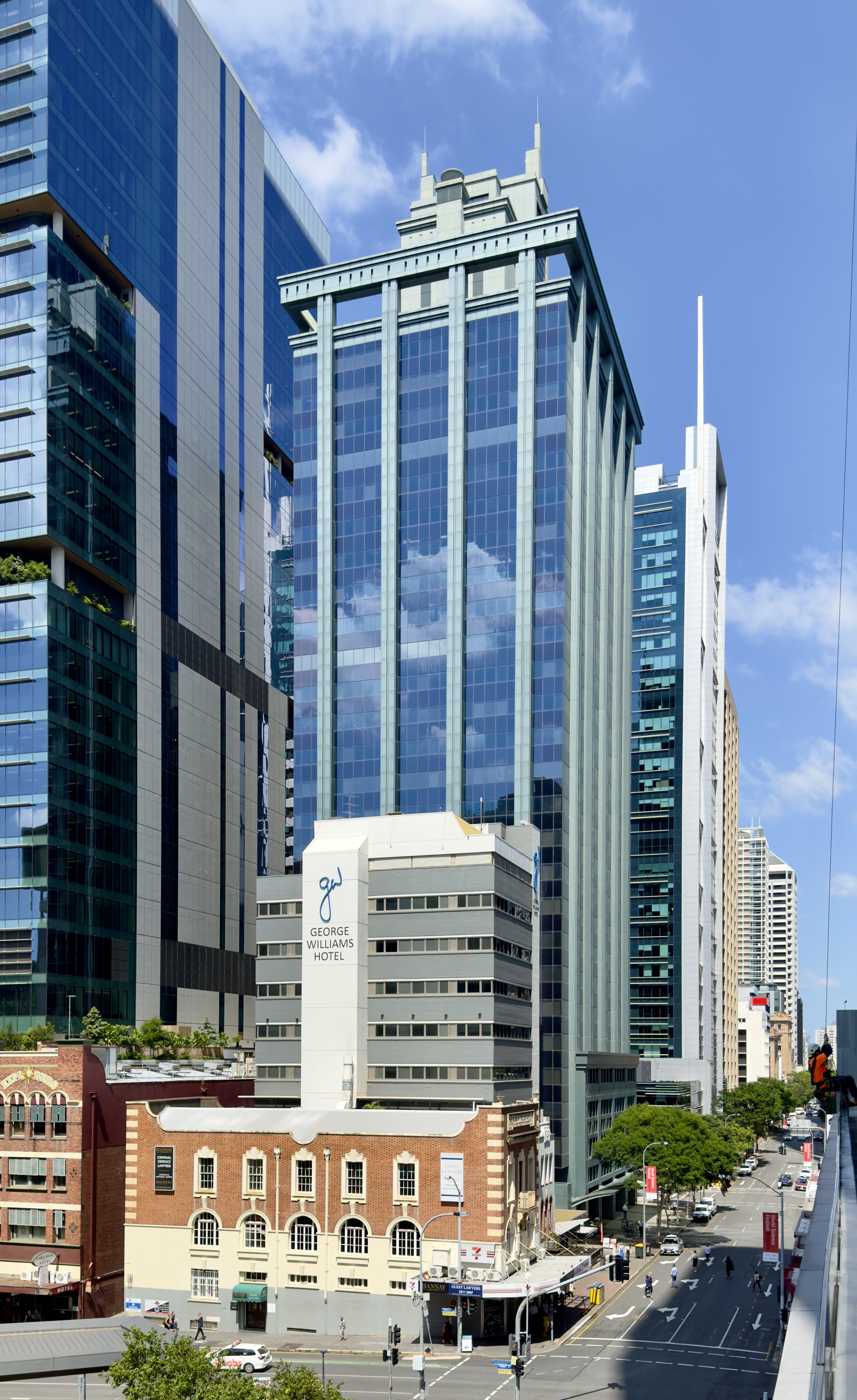
State Law Building, Brisbane QLD

Conrad Gargett has designed some of Australia's landmark buildings, predominately in Queensland, including the following major architectural projects:

| Completed | Firm name | Project name | Location | Award | Notes and Related Articles |
|---|---|---|---|---|---|
| 1890 | HW Atkinson | Fire Brigade Head Station, Ann & Edward St | Brisbane City | | (Demolished) |
| 1892 | HW Atkinson | Coorparoo School of Arts and RSL Memorial Hall | Coorparoo | | (State Heritage Place) |
| 1903 | HW Atkinson | Wesleyan Methodist Church, Linton Street | Kangaroo Point | | (Local Heritage Place) |
| 1906 | HW Atkinson | Brisbane Fruit & Produce Markets, Turbot St | Brisbane | | (Local Heritage Place) |
| 1906 | HW Atkinson | Queensland Brewery (additions) | Fortitude Valley | | |
| 1907 | HW Atkinson & Charles McLay | Fire Station, Ann & Wharf St | Brisbane | | (Demolished) |
| 1907 | HW Atkinson & Charles McLay | Villa Residence "Denila", for FAJ Isles, Jordan Tce | Bowen Hills | | (Local Heritage Place) |
| 1909 | HW Atkinson & Charles McLay | Ithaca Town Council Chambers | Red Hill | | (State Heritage Place) |
| 1910 | HW Atkinson & Charles McLay | Fitzroy Chambers (renamed Commerce House) | Brisbane City | | |
| 1910 | HW Atkinson & Charles McLay | McWhirters & Son, Wickham & Warner St | Fortitude Valley | | (State Heritage Place) |
| 1912 | HW Atkinson & Charles McLay | Desmond Chambers, Adelaide St | Brisbane City | | (Local Heritage Place) |
| 1918 | HW Atkinson & Charles McLay | Church of England Grammar School (Churchie) | East Brisbane | | (Local Heritage Place) |
| 1918 | HW Atkinson & Charles McLay | Trades and Labour Hall | Brisbane City | | (Demolished) |
| 1920 | Atkinson & Conrad | The Southport School | Southport | | |
| 1923 | Atkinson & Conrad | St Paul's Anglican Church and Columbarium | East Brisbane | | (State Heritage Place) |
| 1925 | Atkinson & Conrad | Gordon and Gotch, Adelaide St | Brisbane City | | |
| 1926 | Atkinson & Conrad | Atcherley Private Hotel, Adelaide St | Brisbane City | | (Demolished) |
| 1926 | Atkinson & Conrad | Craigston Apartments, Wickham Tce | Spring Hill | | (State Heritage Place) |
| 1926 | Atkinson & Conrad | Block 2 & Block 3, Royal Brisbane Hospital | Herston | | (Demolished) |
| 1927 | Atkinson & Conrad | Residence and rooms for Dr Hedley Brown | Nundah | | |
| 1927 | Atkinson & Conrad | Masonic Temple, Ann St (designed by Lange Powell) | Brisbane City | | (State Heritage Place) |
| 1928 | Atkinson, Powell & Conrad | St John's Cathedral (abutment wall) | Brisbane City | | (State Heritage Place) |
| 1928 | Atkinson, Powell & Conrad | National Australia Bank (180 Queen Street) (with A & K Henderson) | Brisbane City | | (State Heritage Place) |
| 1929 | Atkinson, Powell & Conrad | Brisbane Boys' College | Toowong | | (State Heritage Place) |
| 1929 | Atkinson, Powell & Conrad | Lady Lamington Nurses Home (additions), Royal Brisbane Hospital | Herston | | (State Heritage Place) |
| 1930 | Atkinson, Powell & Conrad | Royal Women's Hospital, Royal Brisbane Hospital | Herston | | (Demolished) |
| 1930 | Atkinson, Powell & Conrad | Tristram's Factory (Tristram's West End Market) | West End | | (Register of the National Estate) |
| 1934 | Atkinson, Powell & Conrad | Somerville House Library | South Brisbane | | (State Heritage Place) |
| 1935 | Atkinson, Powell & Conrad | Courier-Mail Building (with Meldrum & Turner), Queen St | Brisbane City | | (Demolished) |
| 1935 | Atkinson, Powell & Conrad | Finney Isles & Co Building (additions), Queen St (now David Jones) | Brisbane City | | (State Heritage Place) |
| 1951 | AH Conrad & TBF Gargett | South Brisbane Auxiliary Hospital (now Princess Alexandra Hospital) | Woolloongabba | | (Demolished) |
| 1953 | AH Conrad & TBF Gargett | Cromwell College, University of Queensland | St Lucia | | |
| 1953 | AH Conrad & TBF Gargett | Prince Charles Hospital (Sanatorium & Nurses Quarters) | Chermside | | (Sanatorium demolished) |
| 1954 | AH Conrad & TBF Gargett | St John's College, University of Queensland | St Lucia | | |
| 1955 | AH Conrad & TBF Gargett | MLC (with Bates Smart), Adelaide & Edward St | Brisbane City | | |
| 1958 | AH Conrad & TBF Gargett | Women's College, University of Queensland | St Lucia | | |
| 1960 | AH Conrad & TBF Gargett | St John's Cathedral (extension to nave) | Brisbane City | | (State Heritage Place) |
| 1960 | AH Conrad & TBF Gargett | Physiology Lecture Theatres, University of Queensland | St Lucia | | |
| 1961 | AH Conrad & TBF Gargett | Commonwealth Bank Building, King George Square | Brisbane City | | |
| 1962 | AH Conrad & TBF Gargett | Queensland Newspapers | Bowen Hills | | |
| 1963 | AH Conrad & TBF Gargett | Bishopsbourne (Archbishop's Chapel) | Hamilton | | |
| 1963 | AH Conrad & TBF Gargett | Sir William MacGregor Building, University of Queensland | St Lucia | | |
| 1965 | AH Conrad & TBF Gargett | Head Fire Station, Kemp Place | Fortitude Valley | | |
| 1965 | AH Conrad & TBF Gargett | The Age Newspapers | Tullamarine, Melbourne | | |
| 1967 | AH Conrad & TBF Gargett | SGIO Offices and Theatre | Brisbane City | | (Demolished; now Suncorp Metway Plaza) |
| 1968 | AH Conrad & TBF Gargett | Block 7 & Block 8, Royal Brisbane Hospital | Herston | | |
| 1970 | AH Conrad & TBF Gargett | Brisbane Administration Centre and City Plaza | Brisbane City | | (City Plaza demolished) |
| 1971 | AH Conrad & TBF Gargett | ANZ Head Office, Queen & Creek St | Brisbane City | | |
| 1971 | AH Conrad & TBF Gargett | 100 George Street, Executive Building (with State Dept. of Works) | Brisbane City | | |
| 1972 | AH Conrad & TBF Gargett | Central Railway Administration Building, Central Station (with Civil & Civic) | Brisbane City | | |
| 1973 | AH Conrad & TBF Gargett | Comalco House, George & Ann St (now State Law Building) | Brisbane City | | |
| 1974 | AH Conrad & TBF Gargett | National Bank House (formerly Estates House) | Brisbane City | | |
| 1978 | Conrad Gargett and Partners | National Mutual Centre, Edward & Charlotte St (with Civil & Civic) | Brisbane City | | |
| 1981 | Conrad Gargett and Partners | Santos House and Rowes Arcade, Adelaide St | Brisbane City | | |
| 1981 | Conrad Gargett and Partners | Queensland Parliament House (conservation with State Dept. of Works) | Brisbane City | | |
| 1982 | Conrad Gargett and Partners | Sheraton Hotel (now Sofitel), Central Station | Brisbane City | | |
| 1983 | Conrad Gargett and Partners | The Mansions (conservation), George St | Brisbane City | | (State Heritage Place) |
| 1985 | Conrad Gargett and Partners | Queensland Mapping and Surveying Building | Woolloongabba | | |
| 1989 | Conrad Gargett and Partners | Commonwealth Bank Head Office, Queen & Edward St | Brisbane City | | (State Heritage Place) |
| 1990 | Conrad Gargett and Partners | St Martin's House (adaptive reuse), St John's Cathedral Precinct | Brisbane City | | (State Heritage Place) |
| 1991 | Conrad Gargett and Partners | Queensland Newspapers | Murarrie | | |
| 1992 | Conrad Gargett and Partners | State Law Building (renovation), Ann St | Brisbane City | | |
| 1993 | Conrad Gargett and Partners | Therapies and Anatomy, University of Queensland | St Lucia | | |
| 1995 | Conrad Gargett | Brisbane Customs House | Brisbane CBD | | (state heritage place) |
| 1996 | Conrad Gargett | Balmoral Water Reserve | Brisbane City | | |
| 1999 | Conrad Gargett | Brisbane City Hall | Brisbane City | | (state heritage place) |
| 2000 | Conrad Gargett | Australian Catholic University Masterplan | Banyo | | |
| 2000 | Conrad Gargett | Spring Hill Baths | Brisbane City | | (state heritage place) |
| 2001 | Conrad Gargett | RAAF Base Amberley Redevelopment | Amberley | | |
| 2001 | Conrad Gargett | St Stephens Cathedral | Brisbane City | | (state heritage place) |
| 2003 | Conrad Gargett | Blackall Woolscour conservation | Blackall | RAIA Conservation Award (2003) | (state heritage place) |
| 2004 | Conrad Gargett | Brisbane City Hall | Brisbane City | | |
| 2004 | Conrad Gargett | Combined Mess Facility, RAAF Base Townsville | Townsville | | |
| 2004 | Conrad Gargett | Clinical Science Building I Griffith University | Brisbane City | | |
| 2005 | Conrad Gargett | State Library of Victoria Redevelopment | Melbourne City | | |
| 2006 | Conrad Gargett | St Stephen's Cathedral Precinct | Brisbane City | | |
| 2009 | Conrad Gargett | Warroo Shire Hall | Warroo | | (state heritage place) |
| 2009 | Conrad Gargett | Barambah Station | Barambah | | |
| 2009 | Conrad Gargett | Holy Spirit Seminary, Brisbane Australian Catholic University | Banyo | | |
| 2009 | Conrad Gargett | Old Government House Conservation and Adaptation | Gardens Point | Union of International Architects – Honourable Mention – UIA Prize Friendly Spaces Accessible to All (2014) | (state heritage place) |
| 2009 | Conrad Gargett | Former West's Furniture Showroom | Fortitude Valley | | |
| 2010 | Conrad Gargett | Queen Victoria Building Refurbishment | Sydney CBD | | |
| 2011 | Conrad Gargett | Australian Tropical Science Innovation Project | Townsville | | |
| 2012 | Conrad Gargett | Harvey's Bistro | Fortitude Valley | | |
| 2013 | Conrad Gargett | Emergency Shelter Competition | Brisbane City | International Young Architects Ideas Awards and Exhibition – First Prize (2013) | |
| 2013 | Conrad Gargett | BDO Workplace | Brisbane | | |
| 2013 | Conrad Gargett | Harrison Grierson Workplace | Brisbane | | |
| 2013 | Conrad Gargett | Goddard Building Rooftop Expansion University of Queensland | St Lucia | AIA Architecture Awards – Queensland Award for Heritage (2015); National Trust Queensland Heritage Awards – David Eades Award (2014) | |
| 2013 | Conrad Gargett | Mt Isa Hospital Redevelopment | Mt Isa | | |
| 2014 | Conrad Gargett | St Stephen's Hospital | Hervey Bay | Australian Interior Design Awards – Shortlist, Public Buildings (2015) | |
| 2014 | Conrad Gargett | Queensland Children's Hospital (with Lyons) | South Brisbane | AIA Architecture Awards – John Dalton Award for Building of the Year (2015); Design and Health International Academy Awards – Overall Winner – Salutogenic Design Project for Healthcare Environment (2015); World Architecture Festival Building of the Year – Shortlist, Health (2015); Design and Health International Academy Awards – Winner – International Future Health Projects (2013) | |
| 2014 | Conrad Gargett | ACU St John Paul II Building T | Brisbane, Queensland | | |
| 2015 | Conrad Gargett | St John Paul II Building Australian Catholic University | Banyo | | |
| 2015 | Conrad Gargett | General Electric Headquarters | Springfield, Queensland | | |
| 2015 | Conrad Gargett | Brian Wilson Chancellery, University of Queensland | St Lucia | | |
| 2016 | Conrad Gargett | The Piano Mill | Stanthorpe, Queensland | World Architecture Festival — Culture – Category Winner (2018) | |
| 2016 | Conrad Gargett | Collection House Workplace | Brisbane, Queensland | | |
| 2016 | Conrad Gargett | Griffith University Aquatic Centre and Gym | Gold Coast, Queensland | Australian Institute of Architects, Queensland Architecture Award — Building of the Year (Gold Coast region) | |
| 2016 | Conrad Gargett | UQ Whitty Building | Brisbane, Queensland | AIA Awards — Queensland Architecture Awards – Heritage; Silver Heritage Award for Conservation — National Trust Queensland Heritage Award | |
| 2017 | Conrad Gargett | St Laurence’s STEM and Sports Centre | Brisbane, Queensland | | |
| 2017 | Conrad Gargett | QUT Gardens Point OJW Conference Venue | Brisbane, Queensland | | |
| 2018 | Conrad Gargett | Africa Hall Redevelopment | Addis Ababa, Ethiopia | | |
| 2018 | Conrad Gargett | Coorparoo Square | Brisbane, Queensland | Property Council of Australia's Innovation and Excellence Award — National Winner for Best Mixed Use Development | |
| 2018 | Conrad Gargett | Queensland Theatre’s Bille Brown Theatre | Brisbane, Queensland | | |
| 2018 | Conrad Gargett | North Shore State School | Townsville, Queensland | | |
| 2018 | Conrad Gargett | Sydney Ferry Wharves Upgrade Project | Sydney, New South Wales | Sydney Ferry Wharves Upgrade Project – Conrad Gargett | |
| 2019 | Conrad Gargett | Maritimo | Brisbane, Queensland | 2022 AIA Architecture Awards — Commended for Brisbane Region Heritage Architecture | |
| 2019 | Conrad Gargett | Glenala State High School | Brisbane, Queensland | | |
| 2019 | Conrad Gargett | Ogden Street Transport Revitalisation Project | Townsville, Queensland | | |
| 2020 | Conrad Gargett | Proserpine Administration and Local Disaster Coordination Centre | Proserpine, Queensland | 2022 AIA Regional Awards North Queensland, Walter and Oliver Tunbridge Building of the Year, North Queensland; 2022 AIA Regional Awards North Queensland, Commendation | |
| 2020 | Conrad Gargett | Smalls Road Public School | Ryde, Sydney | | |
| 2020 | Conrad Gargett | Rockhampton Performing Arts and Convention Centre | Rockhampton, Queensland | | |
| 2020 | Conrad Gargett | Newcastle Station Stage 2 Redevelopment & Public Realm | Newcastle, New South Wales | 2021 PIA Awards for Planning Excellence, NSW — Great Place Award; Australian Institute of Architects — Commendation for Urban Design | |
| 2020 | Conrad Gargett | Building 8, RNA Showgrounds | Brisbane, Queensland | 2022 AIA Architecture Awards — Commended for Brisbane Region Heritage Architecture | |
| 2021 | Conrad Gargett | York Street | Beenleigh, Queensland | | |
| 2021 | Conrad Gargett | Timbin House | North Stradbroke Island | | |
| 2021 | Conrad Gargett | Minokō | North Stradbroke Island | 2022 AIA Architecture Awards — Commended for Brisbane Region Residential Architecture (New) | |
| 2021 | Conrad Gargett | Queensland Rail Station Design Manual | Queensland | 2022 Good Design Award Winner — Communication Design; 2021 Best Design Awards — Editorial and Books Finalist; 2021 AGDA Awards — Books – Entire Book Finalist | |
| 2022 | Conrad Gargett | Rockhampton Museum of Art | Rockhampton, Queensland | | Sir Zelman Cowen Award for Public Architecture, 2023; FDG Stanley Award for Public Architecture (Queensland), 2023; JW Wilson Award for Building of the Year, 2023 (Central Queensland Regional Award); Regional Commendation for Public Architecture, 2023 (Central Queensland Regional Award) |
| 2022 | Conrad Gargett | Thomas Dixon Centre, Home of the Queensland Ballet | Brisbane, Queensland | | = |
| 2022 | Conrad Gargett | National School Building at Warwick East State School | Warwick, Queensland | | |
| Current | Conrad Gargett | Mohammed bin Salman “Misk” Foundation Centre | Mohammed Bin Salman Nonprofit City, Saudi Arabia | | |
| Current | Conrad Gargett | The HIVE | Townsville, Queensland | | |

== See also ==
- Architecture of Australia
