= State Law Building =

Government building in Brisbane, Queensland

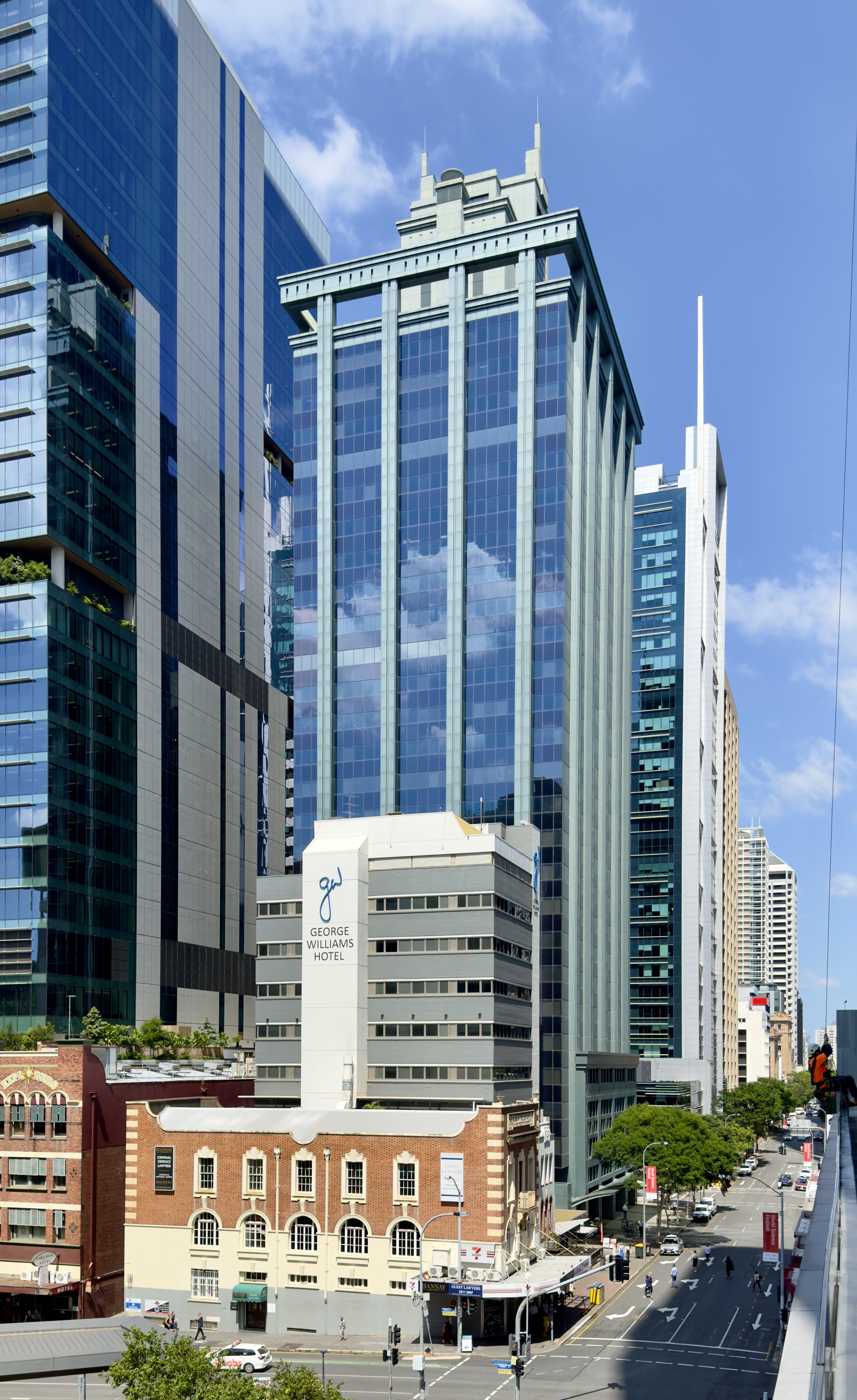
- State Law Building, 2024
- Alternative names: Batman Building

General information
- Status: Opened
- Type: Office
- Location: 50 Ann Street, Brisbane, Queensland
- Current tenants: Queensland Government
- Completed: Completed in 1977; 49 years ago Reclad in 1995; 31 years ago

Height
- Height: 128 m

Technical details
- Floor count: 30

Design and construction
- Architect: Sipen Rojnavibul
- Architecture firm: Conrad Gargett & Partners

The State Law Building, commonly known as the Batman Building, is an office building at 50 Ann Street, Brisbane, Australia, which hosts offices of the Queensland Department of Justice and other government agencies.

== History ==
It was completed in 1977 as Comalco House and featured aluminium external cladding (as Comalco was an aluminium manufacturer). It was refurbished in 1993 when the aluminium cladding was removed. Both the original construction and the refurbishment were overseen by local firm Conrad Gargett & Partners.

Following its complete refurbishment in 1995, the State Law Building became an iconic feature of the city, widely referred to by locals and the media as "Gotham Tower" and the "Batman Building" for its perceived resemblance to the architectural style of the fictional American city of Gotham appearing in comic books published by DC Comics.

== Geography ==
The State Law Building is close to the Queen Elizabeth II Courts of Law (which includes the Supreme Court of Queensland and the District Court of Queensland), as well as the Commonwealth Law Courts.

== Photos of the State Law Building ==
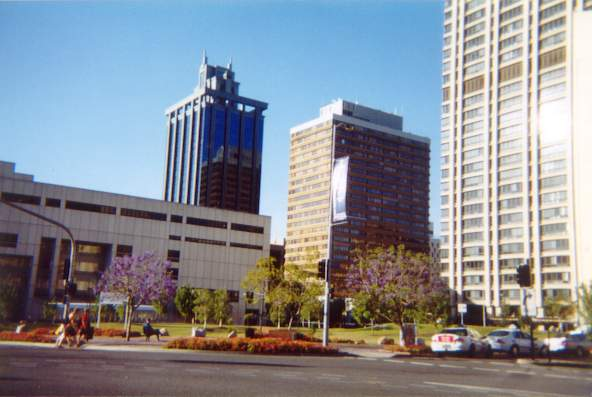
The Adelaide Street facade of the now-defunct Law Courts Complex with the State Law Building behind it

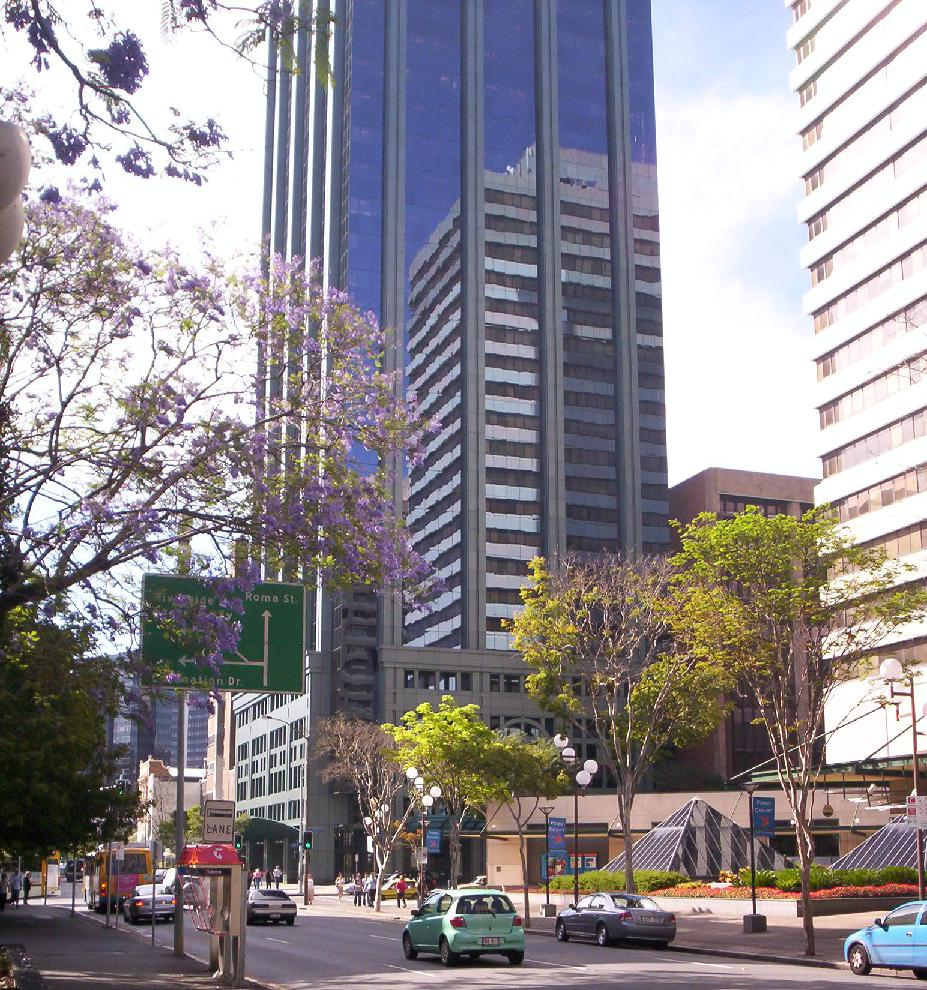
State Law Building
George Street facade

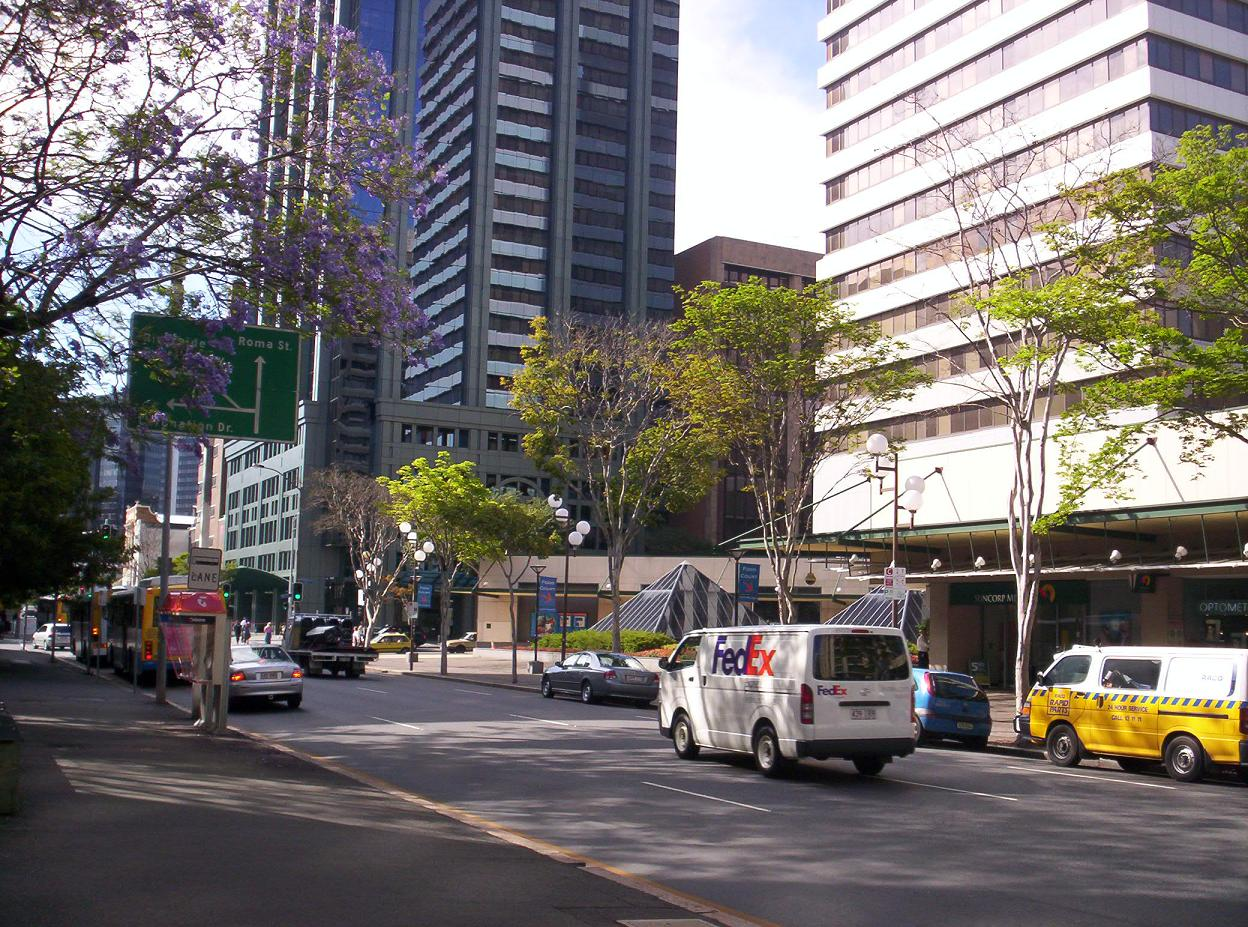
State Law Building
view from the Law Courts Complex
