= Suncorp Plaza =

Building in Brisbane, Queensland

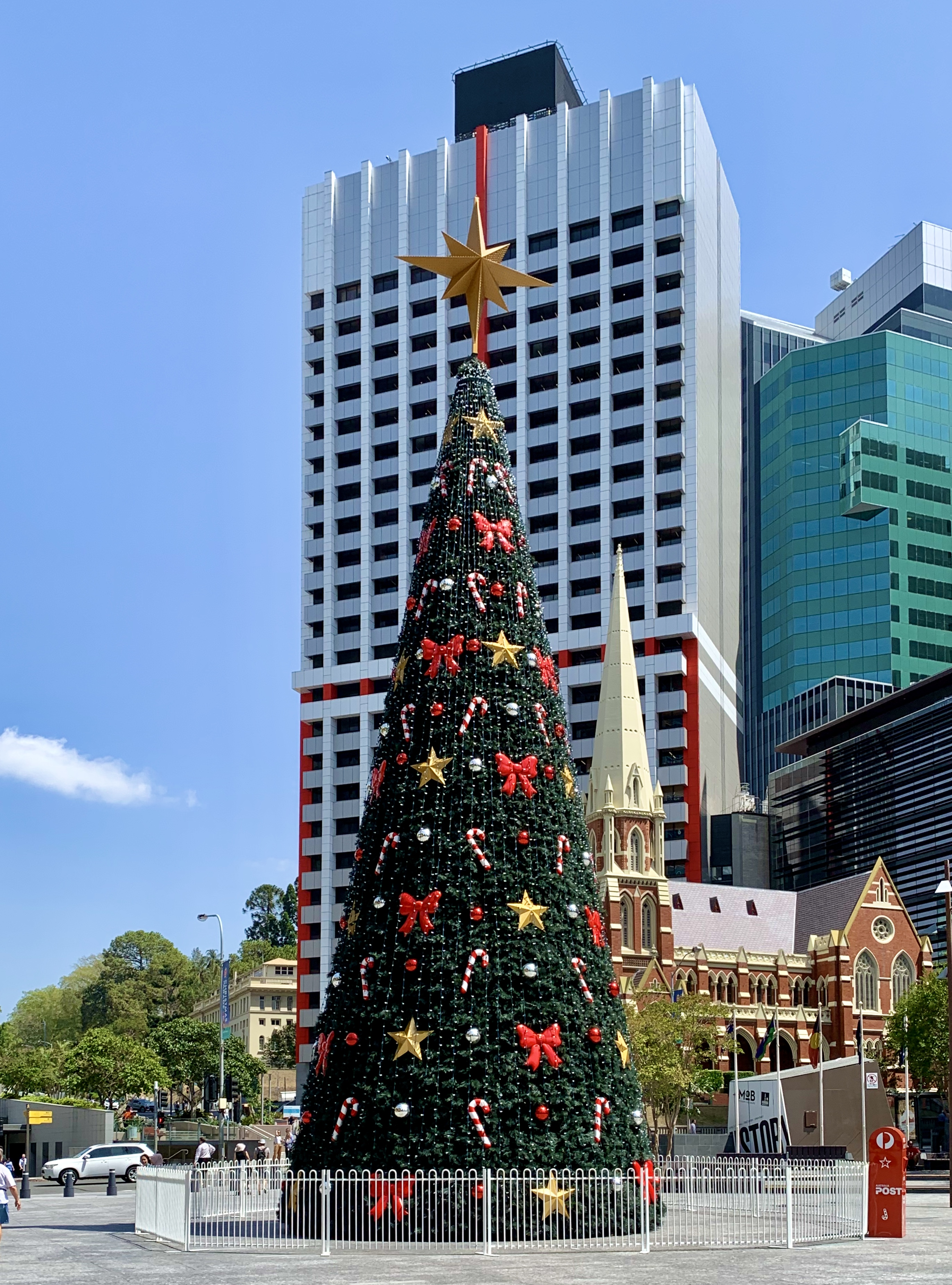
- View of Suncorp Plaza from King George Square with Christmas tree in December 2019
- Interactive map of the Suncorp Plaza area

General information
- Status: Completed
- Type: Commercial Office
- Location: Brisbane, Queensland, Australia, 343 Albert Street
- Coordinates: 27°28′03″S 153°01′25″E
- Completed: 1971

Height
- Roof: 118 m (387 ft)

Technical details
- Floor count: 26

Design and construction
- Developer: Amalgamated Property Group

Suncorp Plaza is a high-rise building in Brisbane, Queensland, Australia.

Suncorp Plaza, formerly known as the SGIO Building and Theatre, is located on the intersection of Albert and Turbot streets. The building is opposite the Brisbane Dental Hospital (on the Turbot Street side). Suncorp Plaza is 118 metres (387 ft) tall and consists of 26 floors, dedicated to office space. The primary tenant of the building was Suncorp, until the company moved to the recently completed Brisbane Square building.

The building was designed by architects Conrad & Gargett. Upon its completion in 1971, Suncorp Plaza was Brisbane's tallest building, however, it lost this position in 1973 and was one of tallest building in Brisbane.

Suncorp Plaza features a 10-metre digital clock featuring the Suncorp logo, which is the highest clock in Australia. Prior to the placement of the clock, a rotating restaurant was located on the roof of the building.

It was proposed that the building be demolished sometime in 2018/2019 to make way for a new tower. However, as of 2020, no work has begun on its demolition. The theatre, once the home of the Queensland Theatre Company, has already been demolished.

== See also ==
- List of tallest buildings in Brisbane
