= Brenan Gargett =

Australian architect

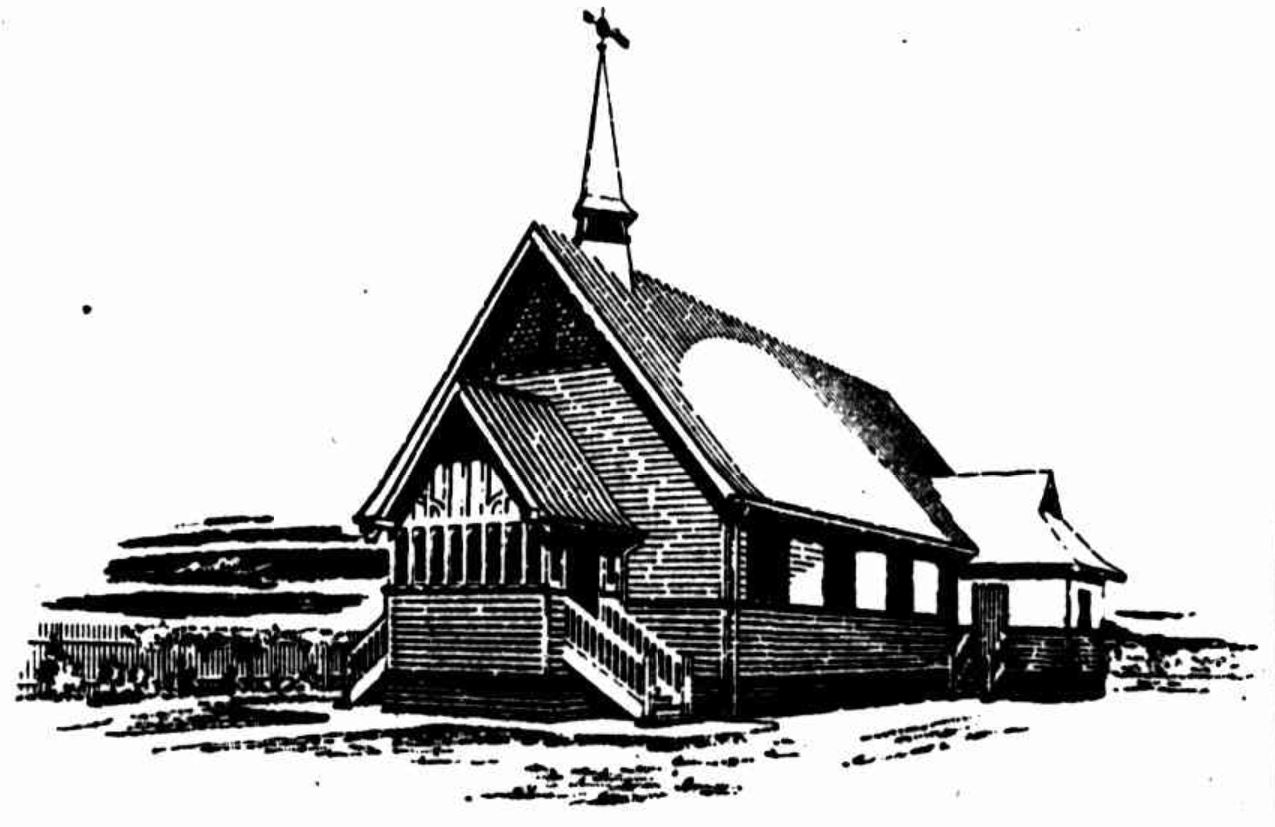
Cracknell Road Congregational Church, designed by Brenan Gargett, 1925

Thomas Brenan Femister Gargett (1898–1975) was an architect in Brisbane, Queensland, Australia. Many of his buildings have been heritage-listed. He is one of the original founders of Conrad Gargett, a long-running architectural practice in Brisbane.

== Notable works ==
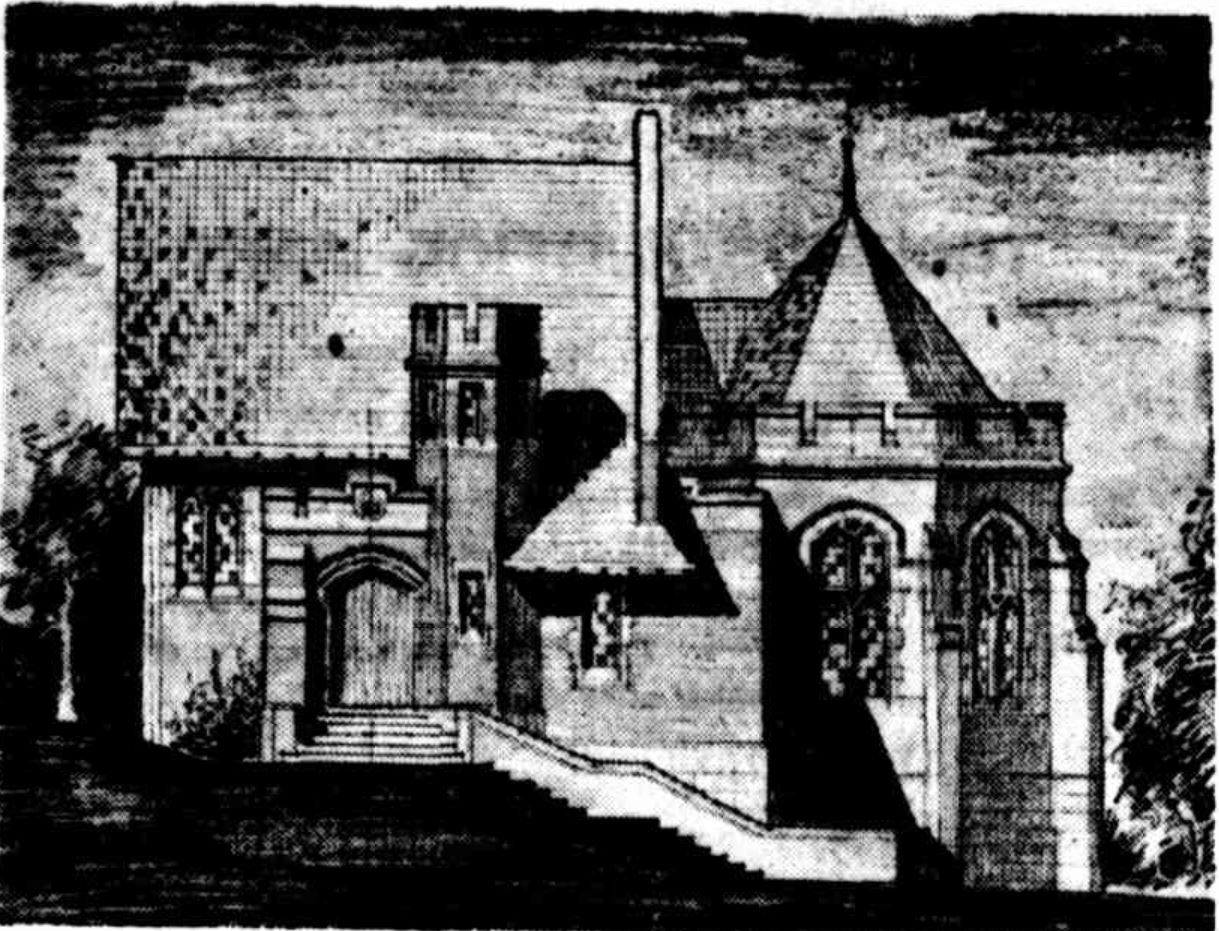
Harker Memorial Library, Somerville House, 1934

His heritage-listed works include:

- 1925: Cracknell Road Congregational Church (now Brisbane Fijian Uniting Church), Annerley
- 1933: former South Brisbane Congregational Church (now Saint Nicholas Free Serbian Orthodox Church), South Brisbane
- 1935: Harker Memorial Library at Somerville House
- 1958–59: St Michael and All Angels Church, New Farm
