= West's Furniture Showroom =

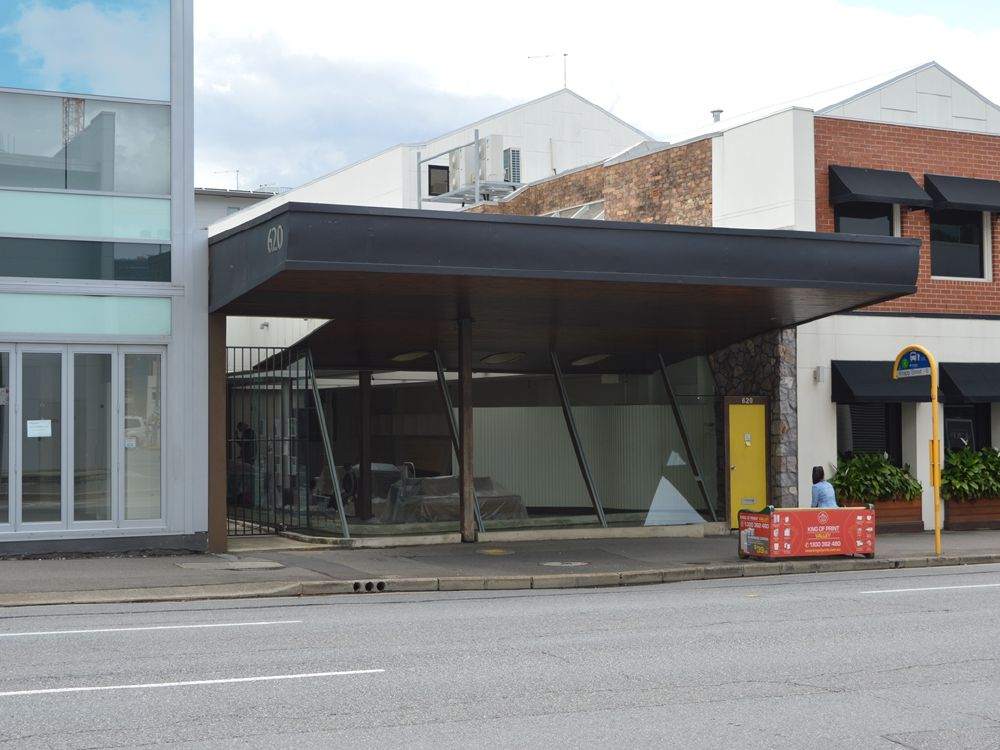
- View from across Wickham Street to the showroom, 2015

- Location within Queensland
- 27.4512°S 153.0398°E
- Location: 620 Wickham Street, Fortitude Valley, Brisbane, Queensland, Australia

History
- Design period: 1940s–1960s Post-WWII
- Built: 1952–1953

Site notes
- Architect: Karl Langer
- Architectural style: Modernism

Queensland Heritage Register
- Official name: West's Furniture Showroom (former)
- Type: state heritage
- Designated: 4 December 2015
- Reference no.: 650008
- Type: Retail, wholesale, services: Showroom
- Theme: Developing secondary and tertiary industries: Marketing, retailing and service industries

West's Furniture Showroom is a heritage-listed former shop at 620 Wickham Street, Fortitude Valley, Brisbane, Queensland, Australia. It was designed by Karl Langer and built from 1952 to 1953. It was added to the Queensland Heritage Register on 4 December 2015.

== History ==
The former West's Furniture Showroom, completed in early 1953, was commissioned by Laurence (Laurie) West (1918–2013) as a modernist purpose-designed furniture showroom. Located at the northeast end of Fortitude Valley, one of Brisbane's busiest shopping centres at the time, it was designed by architect Dr Karl Langer (1903–1969) to attract attention and provide a setting for West's modern furniture. As the only Australian business licensed to make and sell Knoll furniture between 1956 and 1962, West's Furniture Showroom supplied architects with modern furniture for their buildings, and promoted Modern design both within the design community and to the general public. Sold by the West family in 1964, the building had several owners until its purchase by architect Robert Riddel, who in 2008 instigated and managed restoration and reconstruction works.

Fortitude Valley, located on the north side of the Brisbane central business district (CBD), developed over several stages to become one of Brisbane's most successful shopping centres, concentrated in Ann, Brunswick and Wickham Streets. A major building boom took place there in the 1880s, reflecting the widespread economic and population growth typical of the decade. Old timber buildings were replaced with larger, more impressive buildings, marking the growing sophistication, confidence and population of the suburb. Access was improved by the introduction of public transport in the form of horse-drawn trams (replaced by Brisbane's electric trams in the 1890s). By the close of the 1880s the Valley (as Fortitude Valley is often called by Brisbane residents) had become intensively settled and was beginning to grow rapidly as a secondary retail centre to the city centre. In 1891 the train line from the city was extended to Fortitude Valley, fuelling the growth of industry in the area, with large factories and warehouses established beyond the retail centre, close to workers' dwellings.

It was during the 1880s and 1890s that three major retailers were established in the Valley – Overell's drapery (est. 1883), TC Beirne's drapery (est. 1891), and McWhirters (est. 1898) – whose ongoing expansion reflected the wealth and optimism of Valley retailers, and attracted further activity and capital to the area.

Another building boom took place throughout Brisbane in the 1920s; and the Valley in particular, with its success as a commercial and industrial hub, expanded even further. Connection to the city was improved, and electric trams, which passed the busy corner of Brunswick and Wickham Streets, brought thousands of shoppers to the Valley. In 1949, the year that Fortitude Valley celebrated its centenary of European settlement, the turnover of Valley retailers alone was estimated at £15 million each year, of which the three biggest firms, McWhirters, T C Beirne and Overells, accounted for more than a third.

In the early 1950s the Valley underwent a facelift, with investment of more than £1 million in expanding and modernising buildings in order to compete with "uptown" Queen Street, bringing a "modern slickness" to the area. Old shopfronts were replaced with stainless steel and plate glass, dozens of shops were renovated inside and out, and larger stores were constructed, with new features such as escalators proving very popular with customers. Unlike Queen Street, the Valley had ample room for expansion and plenty of parking space, making it a desirable location for a "shopping centre of the future".

In addition to the major stores, the Valley was home to hundreds of medium and small-scale businesses, including numerous furniture manufacturers and retailers. In the post-World War II (WWII) period, a growing percentage of goods sold in the Valley were coming from factories close to the main shopping centre, including printing, textiles, timber, domestic machinery, motor car assembly, hardware and furniture factories. Fortitude Valley was one of the main hubs for furniture retailers in Brisbane, along with Woolloongabba, South Brisbane and the CBD. The 1951–52 Brisbane Metropolitan Trade and Business Directory lists 18 "furnishers and furniture dealers" in the Valley, most concentrated at the southwest end of Wickham Street. The types of retailers ranged from the large department stores, to shops selling mass-produced furniture at affordable prices, to more specialist retailers who designed and/or made furniture to order.

The most important feature of furniture shops were their showrooms: large, flexible spaces where the furniture was displayed, often in room-like configurations so that customers could visualise the furniture in their own homes. Most furniture showrooms at that time were housed within a variety of commercial or warehouse-type buildings; many in older buildings adapted for display purposes. Showrooms also ranged in size, from single-storey shops to multi-storey complexes of adjoining buildings.

One of the Fortitude Valley furniture businesses was West's Furniture Emporium (West's) at 132–134 Wickham Street, established in 1937 by Frank Presnell West (father of Laurence West). Frank West had purchased the property in 1922 and in 1927–28 a 4-storey building was constructed on the site for Crafti & Co. Ltd, well known furniture retailers. After Crafti & Co. experienced financial difficulties in the mid-1930s and moved out, the building was occupied by West's. Advertisements from the 1930s and 40s show that West's sold a wide variety of furniture, in both "period" and "modern" styles, and their motto was "West's for the Best". Promoting themselves as a small family concern, their furniture was made in a chain of small factories, each specialising in varied classes of furniture.

By the early 1950s, Frank West's son Laurence (Laurie) West had joined the family furniture business. Born in 1918, Laurie became well known in musical circles as a fine baritone singer, and performed in many concerts and singing competitions as a young man in the 1930s and 40s. During WWII he served in the Australian army, attaining the rank of sergeant. After his discharge in April 1946, he and his wife Mary (née Quine, married in 1943) moved into their new, architect-designed residence at Fairfield. While still active in performing and musical circles, Laurie spent a short time studying architecture at the Brisbane Central Technical College. During his studies, Laurie was struck by the lack of local consideration given to the "world scene," especially in terms of interior design. Extending his own knowledge of this field through "extensive reading in libraries and [of] purchased books" – including subscriptions to journals from America, Sweden and Europe – and contact with like-minded individuals, including the architect Karl Langer in Brisbane and Harry Seidler in Sydney, Laurie developed a desire to supply Brisbane (and Australia) with modern furniture. This desire grew in ambition and scale, and in the early 1950s he began planning a new purpose-designed showroom for displaying and selling modern furniture.

The site chosen for the new showroom was at the northeast edge of Fortitude Valley, in a predominantly residential and industrial area. Frank West sold his property at 132–134 Wickham St in 1951 and in the same year purchased 618 Wickham Street (now known as 620 Wickham Street). At the time, the property consisted of an old timber residence with a shop at the front, and had rear access from Knapp Street. In 1951, Laurie West himself drew up some concept plans for a modern showroom on the site, which included a fish pond inside the front display window, a side arcade and entrance, an open-plan showroom with regularly-spaced posts painted bright primary colours, and a flat roof with rooftop garden.

The architect engaged to design West's new furniture showroom was Dr Karl Langer, who had designed Laurie and Mary West's house at Fairfield. Born and educated in Vienna, Langer immigrated to Australia with his wife, artist and art critic Dr Gertrude Langer, in 1939; bringing direct experience of the European Modern Movement to Queensland. In addition to working as an architect, Langer lectured part-time in architecture and architectural design at the University of Queensland from 1940, publishing his influential booklet "Sub-Tropical Housing" in 1944. From 1945 Langer was employed as an assistant town planner by Brisbane City Council and was also commissioned to work on a range of town planning projects around Australia. Concurrently, he completed a wide variety of architectural projects ranging from small, economical domestic work to large commercial and institutional work.

Langer had a pronounced impact upon the built environment of Australia and set new standards for design in Queensland until his death in 1969. His body of work is a clearly-distinguishable exploration of a sub-tropical Modernism and is important in the evolution of Queensland architecture. Langer's designs were typified by modern, highly-functional spaces lit by high levels of natural daylight, naturally ventilated, and incorporated gardens and water features for the occupation and enjoyment of users. They were fit for purpose, while having a degree of flexibility of use. Other important examples of Langer's architectural work include: Langer's residence at St Lucia (1950); the Sugar Research Institute at Mackay (1953); St John's Lutheran Church at Bundaberg (1960); St Peter's Lutheran College Chapel at Indooroopilly (1968); and the former Department of Main Roads Building at Spring Hill (1967).

Langer's design for the new West's showroom comprised a modern display area at the front of the site, with a workshop at the rear housed in the existing residence. This followed the pattern of a new type of small, combined showroom/industrial building which emerged in Queensland in the 1950s. Located in inner city areas on small sites, and built up to the street alignment to match adjacent buildings, these showrooms were usually a single structure of two to three storeys, with large expanses of glazing to the front elevation acting as showcases. They had a clear division between public and private space, with the ground floor area fronting the street housing display and administration areas, while production and storage areas were located to the rear or on upper levels. Detailed attention was given to the design of entry ways, as access to the building was directly off the footpath; and features such as controlled illumination levels, climatic control features and sheltered street frontages reflected a sense of responsibility to the public to provide a comfortable environment.

Completed in early 1953, West's Furniture Showroom was "designed with the utmost economy in the contemporary manner". The showroom comprised a rectangular 64-by-34-foot (20 by 10 m) space with a cantilevered, upswept awning that extended over the Wickham Street footpath. The building was predominantly of masonry construction, with a glass shopfront, a concrete floor, and a shallow-pitched, asbestos- and bitumen-lined roof constructed from timber trusses. The roof-top was used as garden area for displaying outdoor furniture and some furniture assembly operations. The existing timber residence was relocated to the rear of the site and converted for use as a workshop for the assemblage and storage of furniture. The workshop enabled access to the roof-top display area, and was level with Knapp Street for the loading of goods to transport vehicles. Its ground floor consisted of a woodwork shop, and the upper floor was designated for polishing and inventory storage. Public access to the showroom was through a single timber door at the northeast end of the Wickham Street shopfront, adjacent to a random rubble stone wall. Projecting from the angled shopfront, the door frame was supported by glass, so that it appeared to float.

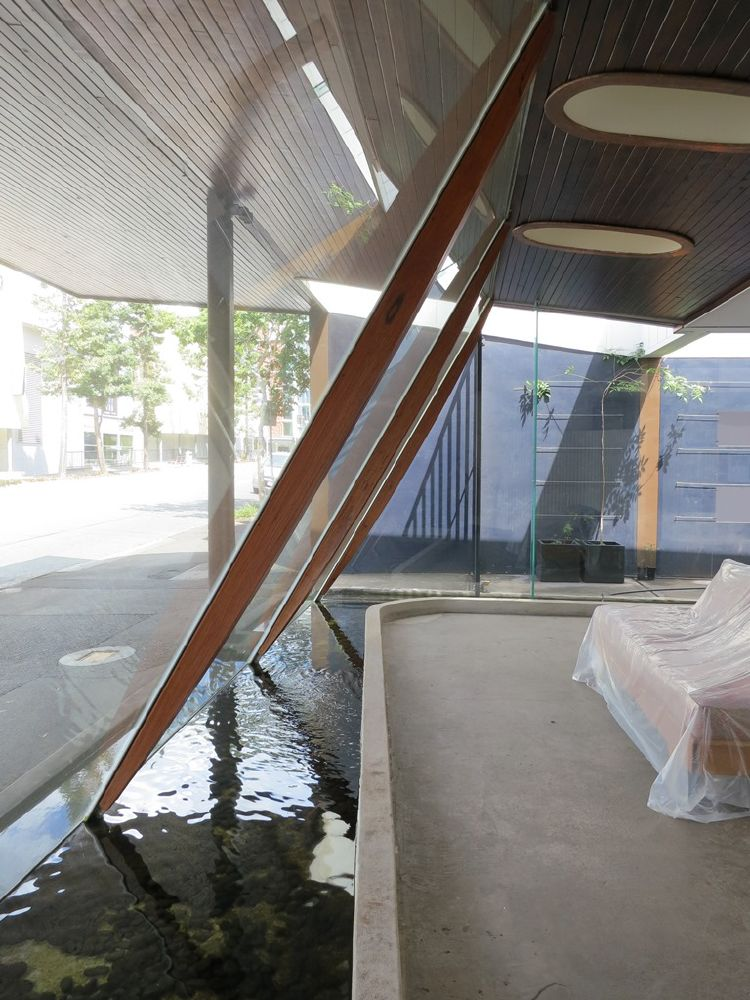
Fish pond at the base of the windows, 2015

As the furniture showroom was located on the edge of the Fortitude Valley shopping area, the shopfront was designed to be dramatic and striking, to catch the attention of potential customers. Supported by timber beams, three floor-to-ceiling windows, measuring 11 feet 6 inches (3.51 m) high by 8 feet (2.4 m) wide, angled in toward the interior at 60 degrees. They were designed to eliminate the reflections of traffic, adjacent buildings and the sky onto footpath pedestrians; while simultaneously attracting the eye of passing traffic by catching reflections of the sky. Along the southwest side of the building, vertical plate glass walls returned into the site and created a pedestrian arcade. This arcade, combined with the absence of a building at the front of the adjacent property, meant that West's furniture collection was noticeably visible when approached from the city and the potential customer had a clear view of the showroom. A concrete-edged, serpentine fish pond meandered around the base of the angled windows and glass return. Supported below the water-line by concrete pads with rubber cushions, the glass appeared to float atop the pond. The pond was decorated with water-plants and fish; and, through its half-interior, half-exterior location, it conveyed the notion of easy access to the furniture inside.

The interior of the showroom comprised a large open space, with a steep set of concrete stairs in the centre of the rear wall through which furniture was transported from the workshop. Hardwood timber columns supported the ceiling – five of which stood in a row, exposed within the showroom and just outside the shopfront. The columns were supported on metal pin-joints, and their timber was crafted to hide cables that led to power outlets at their base. A 1953 article in the publication Architecture Building Engineering explains that there were no fixed partitions or obstructions within the showroom to allow complete flexibility in arranging the displays. Aquariums were planned to flank the rear staircase, set within the rear wall, although it is unclear whether these were ever constructed (new windows line the rear wall in 2015, of similar proportions to those shown in a 1952 plan). Despite the length of the showroom, it was designed to be lit by natural light during the day by three large, rectangular light-wells (featuring a curved southwest edge, and running the length of the showroom), as well as three oval-shaped ventilator-skylights (arranged parallel to the shopfront windows). Both the light-wells and the skylights were covered by corrugated, transparent plastic roofing. The deep roof trusses were designed to ventilate the ceiling space, and Laurence West recalls that the showroom was kept cool by air movement in the large space above the curved plaster ceiling (within the rectangular light-wells).

Construction work for West's Furniture Showroom was carried out by Ajax Builders (concrete and brick works), H Packman (timber), and G McKinnon (skylights and fibrous plaster, ceiling work). West's completed the timber joinery themselves. Installation of the glass within the sloping display windows proved to be a technical challenge. Ten men were required to ease each of the three panes out of their frames and into position, and two panes were broken in the process.

Both the design and function of the showroom demonstrated the shifting tastes and values of post-war Queensland and the strong desire within the design community and beyond to move the state towards new and modern ways of living. Modernist architecture, which developed in pre-World War I Europe and gained popularity in Australia after WWII, was notable for rationalised planning and simplicity of form and detailing. Distinguished by their extensive use of steel, reinforced concrete and glass, Australian buildings in the Modern or "International" style were heavily influenced by American and European examples. Characteristics included sleek, glossy, prismatic forms, cubiform shapes clad with curtain walls and selective expression of structural systems.

Sharing the ideals of the Modernist movement, both international and Australian furniture designers of the mid-20th century sought to revolutionise the contemporary interior. Mid-century modern furniture turned away from traditional, ornate and "over-stuffed" designs that had previously been fashionable, and instead opted for pieces that were lightweight, practical, comfortable, easily rearranged, and scaled to fit within post-war houses. A 1954 article in Home Beautiful advocated that Modern furniture met the needs of the day and rejected the use of ornamentation. Modern furniture was designed to be pared-back and sculptural, and was ideally suited to Modernist architecture.

Influenced by international furniture trends, Australian contemporary furniture designers of the post-war period also promoted a philosophy of innovative "good design" that was both functional and beautiful. An influx of European immigrants introduced specialised skills and knowledge in fine furniture making to Australia; and production techniques developed in war-time manufacturing industries encouraged experimentation in furniture design. Post-war furniture designers, both in Australia and internationally, became innovative in their use of materials, due to an increased availability of some materials and a shortage of others. This experimentation led to the use of unconventional materials in furniture design, such as: curved plastics, fibreglass and aluminium; bent and laminated plywood; spot welding that joined timber to metal, rubber and plastics; sleek and narrow steel rods; cast aluminium; polyester resins; acrylics; and foam rubber. These materials were durable, lightweight and maintenance-free, reducing the burden on everyday living. They were manipulated to create minimalist, clean lines and, following the Bauhaus principle of "form follows function", framing elements were often showcased.

When the new West's Furniture Showroom began operating in 1953 it stocked a wide variety of high-quality, designer Modern furniture, including those from prominent Australian designers: Douglas Snelling (architect, designer of the "Snelling Line", which utilised parachute webbing), Clement Meadmore (industrial designer and sculptor, known for his simple and economical designs that used readily-available materials) and Grant Featherston (designer of the "Contour" line that used bent plywood, which was moulded to the human form). The work of these designers was heavily featured in home-decorating magazines throughout the 1950s.

As well as stocking Australian designers, West's was the first known retailer in Australia to obtain the licence to manufacture and sell the furniture of Knoll Associates (1938–present). Established by Hans Knoll (1914–1955) in New York as the Hans G Knoll Furniture Company, the first Knoll furniture manufacturing plant was opened in Pennsylvania, USA, in 1941. Florence Schust (1917– ), a space planner and designer who had befriended and studied under prominent Modernist architects Eliel Saarinen, Charles Eames, Walter Gropius and Marcel Breuer, was employed by Knoll in 1943. In 1946 Hans and Florence married, and the company changed its name to Knoll Associates. A wide range of prominent architects, designers and artists were engaged to design furniture for their company, including Ludwig Mies van der Rohe, Harry Bertoia, Eero Saarinen, Jens Risom and Marcel Breuer. Influenced by Bauhaus ideals, their furniture was technologically innovative, exceptionally designed, made of high-quality materials and easily mass-produced.

In 1946, Florence established the Knoll Planning Unit – a department which designed interior spaces for corporate clients – and later designed Knoll showrooms to allow the customer to experience their furniture and test potential purchases. The showrooms were distinctively modern, open-planned and generally featured bright interiors of primary colours. The first Knoll showroom opened in New York in 1951 with a coloured ceiling grid, artificial pond, and open layout that allowed for a changing layout of products. As Knoll Associates continued to expand, showrooms were opened in eight other locations throughout America. A subsidiary of the company, Knoll International, was established in 1951 and set about opening Modernist showrooms around the globe in places such as Paris, Stuttgart, Stockholm, Madrid, and Milan. A c. 1956 index released by Knoll Associates lists West's as the only retailer with a licence to sell genuine Knoll furniture in Australia, and as one of only 13 stores selling Knoll furniture outside of America. West's remained the only known licensed manufacturer and retailer of Knoll products in Australia until William Latchford and Sons, a Melbourne firm, obtained a licence in 1962.

Following its opening, West's was featured in various periodicals, including a 1953 Cross Section article, a 1954 issue of Architecture (the Royal Australian Institute of Architect's journal), and on the front cover of Queensland publication Architecture Building Engineering. The showroom was radically different to any other retail building in Brisbane at the time. It was described as having a striking street presence and its planning embraced unique solutions to display problems. Accounts from the West family recall the building being so eye-catching that tourist buses would regularly stop outside, and that Prince Philip, Duke of Edinburgh briefly stopped the Royal Cavalcade to view the building during the Queen's visit in 1954. A few years later, the Queensland Art Gallery showcased furniture from the showroom in their contemporary living room display in the 1958 exhibition, Interiors Past and Present.

West's was "...instrumental in introducing mass-market designer furniture into Brisbane", and sold high-quality furniture not available elsewhere in Australia to a range of prominent architects and well-known personalities. Notable clients included: architects Harry Seidler, Robin Gibson, James Birrell (for the Chermside and Annerley Libraries), Karl Langer (Broadbeach Hotel) and David Bell (Chevron Renaissance); interior designer Langdon Badger; federal politician Harold Holt; and institutions including the Queensland Government, the Canadian Embassy, and the University of Queensland (Student Union Building). At the time, licensing restricted imports to a few sample pieces of furniture, so West's organised a large group of skilled sub-contractors to make parts, which were assembled at the showroom workshop. High quality Australian wools and yarns were used to upholster the furniture made, including those from Ipswich manufacturer, Morrisons.

West's operated from the building until the business closed in November 1963. This was due to a variety of factors, including the loss of its exclusive licence with Knoll in 1962. In 1964 the property was sold to Arthur Walter Barrs, who owned the adjacent building (then 620 Wickham Street, now 622 Wickham Street) from which he ran a car radio business. The former West's showroom remained in the ownership of the Barrs family until the late 1970s, and was at one point leased to Philips Industries Holdings, an electrical products company. Between c. 1988 and 2008, Queensland Used Appliances, now Queensland Appliances, occupied the building (listing their address as 616 Wickham Street).

Over time, the Wickham Street facade of the showroom was converted into a more conventional shopfront – the sloping, front display windows were removed, and new vertical windows that spanned the full width of the site were installed. The pond was concreted in, the glass walls removed, a section of the front awning's ceiling painted over and the light-wells roofed over (although their locations were still visible). The workshop at the rear was demolished between 1974 and 1986, and a skillion-roofed shed was constructed in its place.

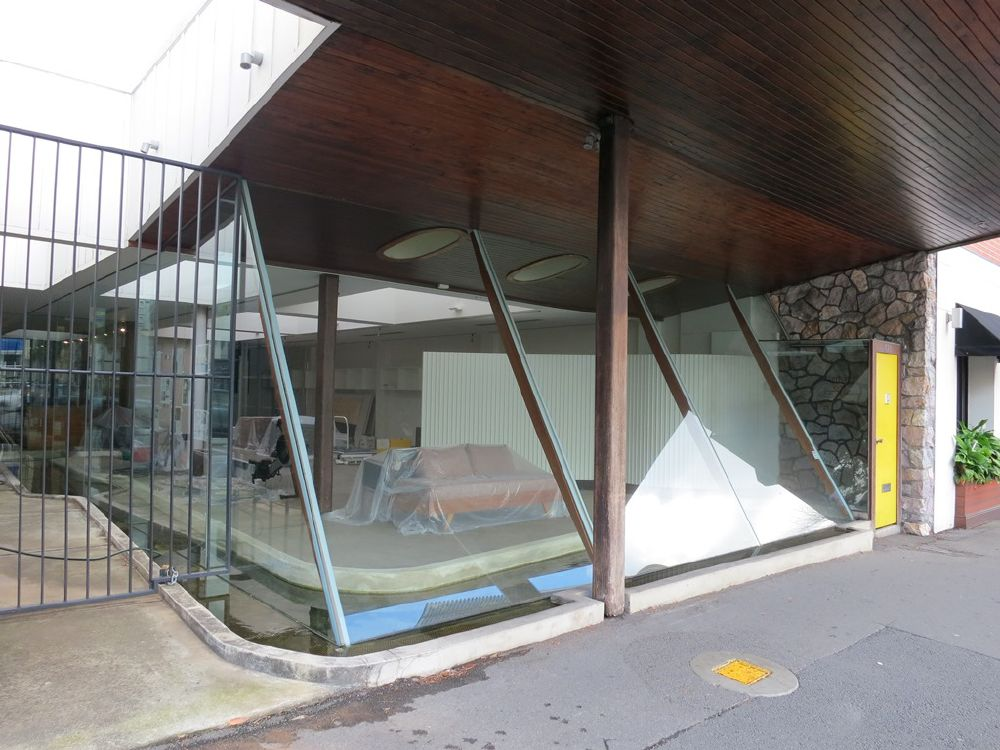
Angled front windows, 2015

In 2008, architect Robert Riddel purchased the building and carried out extensive renovations and conservation work. This was completed with the guidance of Laurence West himself, contemporary documentation, and the evidence provided by original fabric remaining within the building. Marks in the front stone wall and the ceiling lining enabled Riddel to reconstruct the front window at the original angle. A new front door was also installed, replicating the original design. The side pedestrian arcade was re-established with new glass walls, and a new wide glass door and metal ramp were added to the end of the arcade to provide a secondary entrance and equal access. Concrete that had filled the serpentine pond was removed, revealing some early edging and concrete pads. The pond was waterproofed, with the edging reconstructed, and it was once again filled with water. Light-wells were uncovered and re-glazed, with the original arched framing re-sheeted. Paint was removed from the hardwood timber posts and front awning's soffit cladding, and the showroom ceiling was sheeted with new plasterboard. The shed at the rear of the site was gutted, re-lined and its roof was raised; and a new carport was added facing Knapp Street.

Construction was carried out by John Speare Builders and was completed in 2009. In early 2010, the building was converted for use as an office through the addition of lightweight partitions, and was occupied by Riddel Architecture until 2012.

Riddel's restoration and reconstruction of West's Furniture Showroom received both national and international praise and recognition. In 2009 it was awarded a Gold Medal award at the National Trust Heritage Awards, and in 2010 it received the Australian Institute of Architects State and National awards for Heritage. The Jury Citation for the National Award for Heritage praises the Showroom as "...a rare example of the restoration of a mid-century modernist commercial building", and that the reinterpretation and rebuilding process was:

...painstaking but practical and economical. The architects have helped to demonstrate the economic and environmental benefits of preservation over new build. This is not a museum frozen in time. The spirit is faithfully captured; details restored with rigour, energy, affection and wit; and the building revitalized as viable commercial premises.

The project also appeared in publications including IndesignLive (12 August 2009), Brisbane Modern (Issue 3, 2009), Architecture Australia (vol. 99, January–February 2010), Feminity (6 August 2010), and Architecture and Urban Design in Brisbane (vol. 1, 2012). Brisbane Open House, an event launched in 2010 to promote the 'hidden wealth of architecture, engineering and history in buildings and places around Brisbane city', featured West's Furniture Showroom in 2011, 2012 and 2013. The building was also included in the 2014 exhibition Hot Modernism: Building Modern Queensland, 1945–75 at the State Library of Queensland, along with furniture pieces from the Wests' collection.

After a short period of vacancy, in September 2015 the former West's Furniture Showroom was renovated for use as a retail tenancy, with the rear additions converted into living quarters. In June 2023, the Australian Institute of Architects announced it would be purchasing the building for its Queensland headquarters.

== Description ==
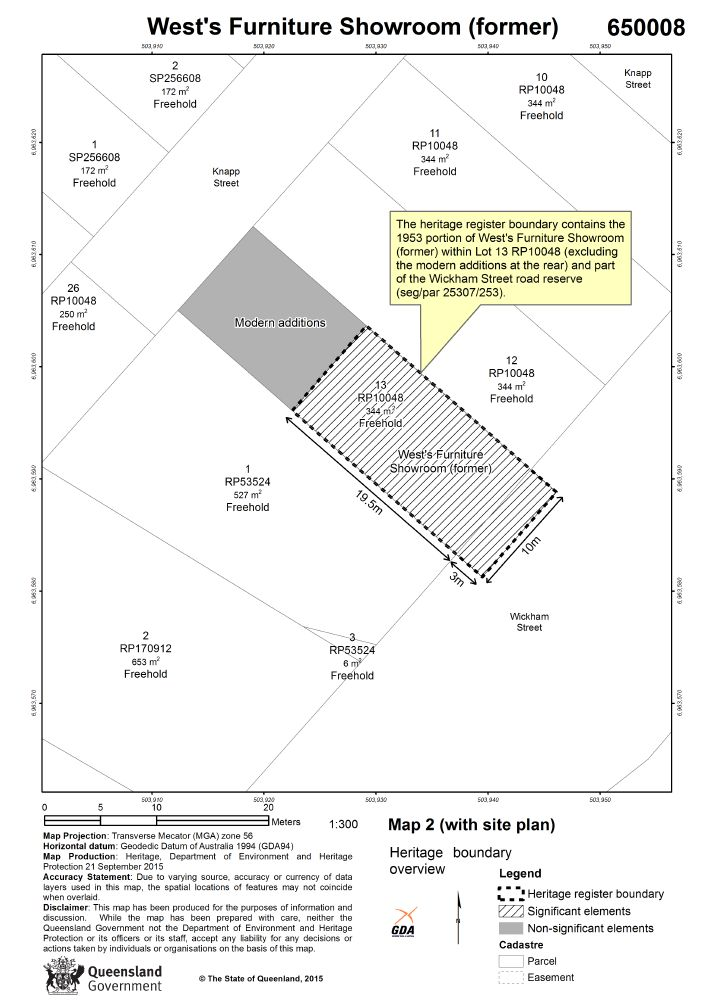
Site map 2015

The former West's Furniture Showroom occupies part of a 344-square-metre (3,700 sq ft) urban block on the northeast edge of Fortitude Valley, Brisbane. Addressing the major thoroughfare of Wickham Street to the southeast, the building is bounded to the northwest by Knapp Street, and to the northeast and southwest by commercial properties of a similar scale. The terraced block is divided into three distinct sections, with the showroom occupying the southeast end. Buildings to the rear of the showroom are outside of the heritage boundary and are not of cultural heritage significance. A cantilevered awning projects from the showroom, over the Wickham Street footpath.

The showroom is a long, lowset, masonry and timber structure with a narrow street frontage. Primary access to the building is via a door at the northeast end of the main shopfront. A pedestrian arcade, running part way along the southwest side, allows access to the rear of the showroom via a secondary entrance. The shallow-pitched roof, constructed of deep timber trusses, is clad in metal sheeting.

The Wickham Street shopfront is largely transparent and sheltered by a large, cantilevered awning that has a tongue-and-groove, v-jointed timber board-lined soffit with a stained finish. The timber entrance door is painted yellow and set within a timber and glass frame, adjacent to a masonry wall clad in random rubble stone. The shopfront comprises reconstructed floor-to-ceiling, steel-framed angled windows, standing on concrete and rubber pads and supported by timber mullions. Angled at 60 degrees, these windows reduce the reflection of light from the glass to pedestrians on the exterior footpath, and reflect the sky from a distance. An irregular-shaped shallow pond with a raised concrete kerb forms the base of the shopfront, with the bottom edge of the glass panels set just below the water's surface. The pond continues around at a right angle to follow the base of a reconstructed glass wall that defines the side pedestrian arcade. The pedestrian arcade has an exposed concrete floor and rectangular ceiling voids which allow light to enter the space. It is partly enclosed by the adjacent property's masonry wall, which is painted in a contrasting colour to distinguish it from original walls.

Shopfront features added as part of the 2008 reconstruction works that differ from the original design include: a metal entrance gate to the pedestrian arcade; a wide glass door at the end of the arcade; metal grates set below the surface of the pond; and a signage display outlining the building's reconstruction. These features are not of cultural heritage significance.

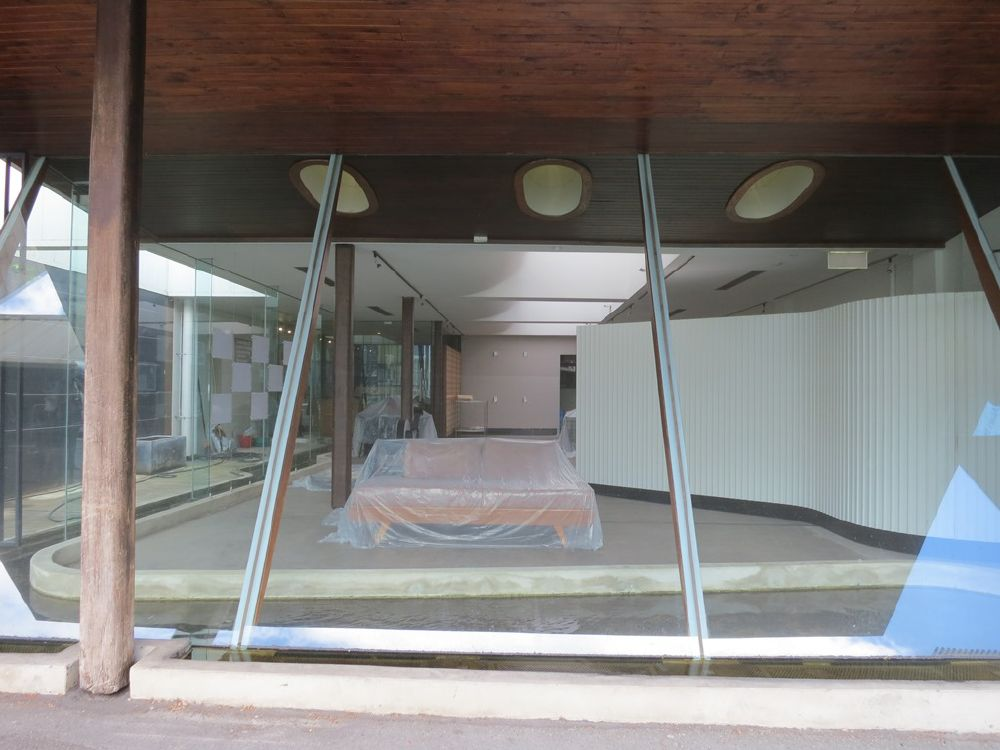
View through the angled shopfront windows, 2015

The showroom comprises a large, open space with plasterboard-lined walls and ceilings, and a polished concrete floor. A single row of hardwood timber columns, stained dark brown and standing on metal pin-joints, runs from the front to the rear of the space. These align with plaster-lined pilasters along the northeast wall. The space is naturally spot-lit by skylights: a row of three small, oval-shaped skylights are located just inside the shopfront windows; and three large, rectangular skylights with a curved southwest edge run the length of the showroom along its central axis. The lower portion of the rear wall of the showroom acts as a retaining wall, with banks of aluminium-framed awning windows above. In the centre of this wall is a steep concrete stair with tubular steel handrail, which leads to the rear building. Separating the showroom and the rear building is a wide, earth-floored void and a second retaining wall. This void is protected by a roof overhang, and access is gained from the stair, through openings in the walls. The showroom roof overhang is set at a steep angle to allow natural light to enter the space, and louvres within its soffit are part of the original ventilation system for cooling the roof space.

Showroom features that are not of cultural heritage significance include: partition walls at the rear of the showroom; a curved partition at the front of the space that defines an entry foyer; recent fit-outs and joinery; and air-conditioning units and vents.

== Heritage listing ==
West's Furniture Showroom was listed on the Queensland Heritage Register on 4 December 2015 having satisfied the following criteria.

The place is important in demonstrating the evolution or pattern of Queensland's history.

The former West's Furniture Showroom (opened in 1953) is important in demonstrating the evolution of architecture and design in the 1950s in Queensland. Purpose-designed as a showroom for Modern furniture, it was influential in the promotion of contemporary design both within the design community and to the general public. It is a distinctive example of a 1950s showroom in Queensland, reflecting modern design principles and aspirations.

The former West's Furniture Showroom is important in demonstrating the principal characteristics of a 1950s showroom, with its carefully detailed shopfront and entrance; large display windows; well-lit, open-plan interior; and clear division between public and private space, with functional and storage spaces located at the rear of the building. It is a fine example of a purpose-designed furniture showroom designed in a bold, modernist style that complemented the furniture it sold.

The place is a good example of the work of architect Dr Karl Langer, and is important in demonstrating the principal characteristics of his work. Most notably, it features an open, functional plan; the expressive use of simplified, angular forms to create a dramatic main shopfront; the manipulation of the effects of natural light, both within the showroom and from the perspective of the viewer outside; a restrained use of high-quality materials, including stone, concrete, glass and timber; and the integration of the interior with the exterior by utilising the effects of glass, water and reflections.

The place is important because of its aesthetic significance.

The West's Furniture Showroom has significance as a distinctive building of architectural quality. In its use of concrete and glass complemented by primary colours, stained timber and stone, the showroom illustrates the use of materials and minimal aesthetic that characterises the mid-20th century modern movement. This is further complemented by the transparent shopfront with framing, open plan interior supported by a single row of columns, and the emphasis on natural lighting.

The main shopfront, with its bold composition of slanted display windows, curvilinear concrete pond and large angled awning, makes an important contribution to the streetscape, standing out dramatically from the adjacent commercial buildings.
